

578001–578100 

|-bgcolor=#d6d6d6
| 578001 ||  || — || October 26, 2013 || Mount Lemmon || Mount Lemmon Survey ||  || align=right | 2.4 km || 
|-id=002 bgcolor=#E9E9E9
| 578002 ||  || — || October 25, 2013 || Mount Lemmon || Mount Lemmon Survey ||  || align=right | 1.1 km || 
|-id=003 bgcolor=#E9E9E9
| 578003 ||  || — || January 19, 2015 || Mount Lemmon || Mount Lemmon Survey ||  || align=right | 2.0 km || 
|-id=004 bgcolor=#E9E9E9
| 578004 ||  || — || October 26, 2013 || Mount Lemmon || Mount Lemmon Survey ||  || align=right | 1.3 km || 
|-id=005 bgcolor=#E9E9E9
| 578005 ||  || — || October 30, 2013 || Haleakala || Pan-STARRS ||  || align=right | 1.7 km || 
|-id=006 bgcolor=#E9E9E9
| 578006 ||  || — || October 24, 2013 || Mount Lemmon || Mount Lemmon Survey ||  || align=right | 1.3 km || 
|-id=007 bgcolor=#C2FFFF
| 578007 ||  || — || October 31, 2013 || Mount Lemmon || Mount Lemmon Survey || L5 || align=right | 6.6 km || 
|-id=008 bgcolor=#C2FFFF
| 578008 ||  || — || October 24, 2013 || Mount Lemmon || Mount Lemmon Survey || L5 || align=right | 6.5 km || 
|-id=009 bgcolor=#E9E9E9
| 578009 ||  || — || November 2, 2013 || Palomar || PTF ||  || align=right | 1.5 km || 
|-id=010 bgcolor=#E9E9E9
| 578010 ||  || — || November 16, 2009 || Kitt Peak || Spacewatch ||  || align=right | 2.1 km || 
|-id=011 bgcolor=#C2FFFF
| 578011 ||  || — || January 27, 2004 || Kitt Peak || Spacewatch || L5 || align=right | 11 km || 
|-id=012 bgcolor=#E9E9E9
| 578012 ||  || — || October 16, 2013 || Catalina || CSS ||  || align=right | 1.7 km || 
|-id=013 bgcolor=#E9E9E9
| 578013 ||  || — || July 19, 2013 || Haleakala || Pan-STARRS ||  || align=right data-sort-value="0.97" | 970 m || 
|-id=014 bgcolor=#E9E9E9
| 578014 ||  || — || November 20, 2000 || Apache Point || SDSS Collaboration || (1547) || align=right | 1.3 km || 
|-id=015 bgcolor=#E9E9E9
| 578015 ||  || — || November 6, 2013 || Mount Lemmon || Mount Lemmon Survey ||  || align=right | 2.5 km || 
|-id=016 bgcolor=#E9E9E9
| 578016 ||  || — || December 18, 2009 || Kitt Peak || Spacewatch ||  || align=right | 1.5 km || 
|-id=017 bgcolor=#E9E9E9
| 578017 ||  || — || November 1, 2013 || Kitt Peak || Spacewatch ||  || align=right | 1.4 km || 
|-id=018 bgcolor=#E9E9E9
| 578018 ||  || — || May 26, 2011 || Mount Lemmon || Mount Lemmon Survey ||  || align=right | 2.1 km || 
|-id=019 bgcolor=#E9E9E9
| 578019 ||  || — || November 11, 2004 || Kitt Peak || Spacewatch ||  || align=right | 2.0 km || 
|-id=020 bgcolor=#E9E9E9
| 578020 ||  || — || November 9, 2013 || Mount Lemmon || Mount Lemmon Survey ||  || align=right | 1.5 km || 
|-id=021 bgcolor=#E9E9E9
| 578021 ||  || — || November 9, 2013 || Mount Lemmon || Mount Lemmon Survey ||  || align=right | 1.1 km || 
|-id=022 bgcolor=#E9E9E9
| 578022 ||  || — || November 9, 2013 || Haleakala || Pan-STARRS ||  || align=right | 1.1 km || 
|-id=023 bgcolor=#E9E9E9
| 578023 ||  || — || April 28, 2011 || Haleakala || Pan-STARRS ||  || align=right | 2.5 km || 
|-id=024 bgcolor=#E9E9E9
| 578024 ||  || — || November 9, 2013 || Haleakala || Pan-STARRS ||  || align=right | 1.3 km || 
|-id=025 bgcolor=#E9E9E9
| 578025 ||  || — || November 1, 2013 || Kitt Peak || Spacewatch ||  || align=right data-sort-value="0.79" | 790 m || 
|-id=026 bgcolor=#E9E9E9
| 578026 ||  || — || November 9, 2013 || Haleakala || Pan-STARRS ||  || align=right | 1.4 km || 
|-id=027 bgcolor=#E9E9E9
| 578027 ||  || — || November 7, 2013 || Kitt Peak || Spacewatch ||  || align=right | 1.4 km || 
|-id=028 bgcolor=#E9E9E9
| 578028 ||  || — || November 2, 2013 || Catalina || CSS ||  || align=right | 1.0 km || 
|-id=029 bgcolor=#d6d6d6
| 578029 ||  || — || November 11, 2013 || Mount Lemmon || Mount Lemmon Survey ||  || align=right | 3.1 km || 
|-id=030 bgcolor=#E9E9E9
| 578030 ||  || — || November 12, 2013 || Kitt Peak || Spacewatch ||  || align=right | 1.2 km || 
|-id=031 bgcolor=#E9E9E9
| 578031 ||  || — || January 27, 2015 || Haleakala || Pan-STARRS ||  || align=right | 1.5 km || 
|-id=032 bgcolor=#d6d6d6
| 578032 ||  || — || December 18, 2001 || Socorro || LINEAR || Tj (2.96) || align=right | 1.5 km || 
|-id=033 bgcolor=#d6d6d6
| 578033 ||  || — || January 18, 2015 || Haleakala || Pan-STARRS ||  || align=right | 2.7 km || 
|-id=034 bgcolor=#E9E9E9
| 578034 ||  || — || November 2, 2013 || Kitt Peak || Spacewatch ||  || align=right | 1.8 km || 
|-id=035 bgcolor=#E9E9E9
| 578035 ||  || — || November 4, 2013 || Mount Lemmon || Mount Lemmon Survey ||  || align=right | 1.3 km || 
|-id=036 bgcolor=#C2FFFF
| 578036 ||  || — || November 20, 2014 || Haleakala || Pan-STARRS || L5 || align=right | 6.1 km || 
|-id=037 bgcolor=#E9E9E9
| 578037 ||  || — || November 9, 2013 || Haleakala || Pan-STARRS ||  || align=right | 1.2 km || 
|-id=038 bgcolor=#E9E9E9
| 578038 ||  || — || November 9, 2013 || Haleakala || Pan-STARRS ||  || align=right | 1.1 km || 
|-id=039 bgcolor=#E9E9E9
| 578039 ||  || — || November 10, 2013 || Mount Lemmon || Mount Lemmon Survey ||  || align=right | 2.2 km || 
|-id=040 bgcolor=#E9E9E9
| 578040 ||  || — || November 1, 2013 || Mount Lemmon || Mount Lemmon Survey ||  || align=right | 1.1 km || 
|-id=041 bgcolor=#d6d6d6
| 578041 ||  || — || November 11, 2013 || Mount Lemmon || Mount Lemmon Survey ||  || align=right | 2.1 km || 
|-id=042 bgcolor=#E9E9E9
| 578042 ||  || — || November 10, 2013 || Mount Lemmon || Mount Lemmon Survey ||  || align=right | 1.2 km || 
|-id=043 bgcolor=#E9E9E9
| 578043 ||  || — || November 1, 2013 || Mount Lemmon || Mount Lemmon Survey ||  || align=right | 1.8 km || 
|-id=044 bgcolor=#E9E9E9
| 578044 ||  || — || November 9, 2013 || Haleakala || Pan-STARRS ||  || align=right | 1.7 km || 
|-id=045 bgcolor=#E9E9E9
| 578045 ||  || — || November 9, 2013 || Mount Lemmon || Mount Lemmon Survey ||  || align=right | 1.9 km || 
|-id=046 bgcolor=#E9E9E9
| 578046 ||  || — || November 1, 2013 || Mount Lemmon || Mount Lemmon Survey ||  || align=right | 1.8 km || 
|-id=047 bgcolor=#E9E9E9
| 578047 ||  || — || November 8, 2013 || Mount Lemmon || Mount Lemmon Survey ||  || align=right | 1.7 km || 
|-id=048 bgcolor=#E9E9E9
| 578048 ||  || — || November 10, 2013 || Mount Lemmon || Mount Lemmon Survey ||  || align=right | 1.2 km || 
|-id=049 bgcolor=#fefefe
| 578049 ||  || — || November 4, 2013 || Haleakala || Pan-STARRS ||  || align=right data-sort-value="0.75" | 750 m || 
|-id=050 bgcolor=#d6d6d6
| 578050 ||  || — || November 9, 2013 || Haleakala || Pan-STARRS ||  || align=right | 2.5 km || 
|-id=051 bgcolor=#d6d6d6
| 578051 ||  || — || November 9, 2013 || Haleakala || Pan-STARRS ||  || align=right | 1.8 km || 
|-id=052 bgcolor=#d6d6d6
| 578052 ||  || — || November 9, 2013 || Haleakala || Pan-STARRS ||  || align=right | 2.7 km || 
|-id=053 bgcolor=#E9E9E9
| 578053 Jordillorca ||  ||  || November 26, 2013 || SM Montmagastrell || J. M. Bosch, R. M. Olivera ||  || align=right | 2.6 km || 
|-id=054 bgcolor=#E9E9E9
| 578054 ||  || — || March 23, 2011 || Bergisch Gladbach || W. Bickel ||  || align=right | 2.0 km || 
|-id=055 bgcolor=#E9E9E9
| 578055 ||  || — || August 21, 2004 || Siding Spring || SSS ||  || align=right | 1.7 km || 
|-id=056 bgcolor=#E9E9E9
| 578056 ||  || — || May 4, 2002 || Kitt Peak || Spacewatch ||  || align=right | 3.0 km || 
|-id=057 bgcolor=#E9E9E9
| 578057 ||  || — || August 7, 2000 || Haleakala || AMOS || EUN || align=right | 1.9 km || 
|-id=058 bgcolor=#d6d6d6
| 578058 ||  || — || September 30, 2013 || Oukaimeden || C. Rinner ||  || align=right | 2.6 km || 
|-id=059 bgcolor=#E9E9E9
| 578059 ||  || — || November 6, 2013 || Haleakala || Pan-STARRS ||  || align=right data-sort-value="0.90" | 900 m || 
|-id=060 bgcolor=#E9E9E9
| 578060 ||  || — || November 26, 2013 || Mount Lemmon || Mount Lemmon Survey ||  || align=right | 1.5 km || 
|-id=061 bgcolor=#E9E9E9
| 578061 ||  || — || September 28, 2008 || Mount Lemmon || Mount Lemmon Survey || WIT || align=right data-sort-value="0.84" | 840 m || 
|-id=062 bgcolor=#E9E9E9
| 578062 ||  || — || January 23, 2006 || Kitt Peak || Spacewatch ||  || align=right | 1.9 km || 
|-id=063 bgcolor=#d6d6d6
| 578063 ||  || — || November 27, 2013 || Haleakala || Pan-STARRS ||  || align=right | 2.0 km || 
|-id=064 bgcolor=#E9E9E9
| 578064 ||  || — || December 29, 2005 || Kitt Peak || Spacewatch ||  || align=right data-sort-value="0.80" | 800 m || 
|-id=065 bgcolor=#E9E9E9
| 578065 ||  || — || June 1, 2003 || Kitt Peak || Spacewatch ||  || align=right | 1.8 km || 
|-id=066 bgcolor=#E9E9E9
| 578066 ||  || — || December 20, 2009 || Kitt Peak || Spacewatch ||  || align=right | 2.1 km || 
|-id=067 bgcolor=#fefefe
| 578067 ||  || — || December 28, 2002 || Kitt Peak || Spacewatch || MAS || align=right data-sort-value="0.65" | 650 m || 
|-id=068 bgcolor=#E9E9E9
| 578068 ||  || — || November 12, 2013 || Mount Lemmon || Mount Lemmon Survey ||  || align=right | 1.1 km || 
|-id=069 bgcolor=#fefefe
| 578069 ||  || — || October 14, 2009 || Mount Lemmon || Mount Lemmon Survey ||  || align=right data-sort-value="0.52" | 520 m || 
|-id=070 bgcolor=#E9E9E9
| 578070 ||  || — || April 9, 2002 || Cerro Tololo || M. W. Buie, A. B. Jordan ||  || align=right | 2.2 km || 
|-id=071 bgcolor=#E9E9E9
| 578071 ||  || — || November 27, 2013 || Haleakala || Pan-STARRS ||  || align=right | 2.1 km || 
|-id=072 bgcolor=#E9E9E9
| 578072 ||  || — || November 27, 2013 || Haleakala || Pan-STARRS ||  || align=right | 1.2 km || 
|-id=073 bgcolor=#E9E9E9
| 578073 ||  || — || November 27, 2013 || Haleakala || Pan-STARRS ||  || align=right | 1.8 km || 
|-id=074 bgcolor=#E9E9E9
| 578074 ||  || — || August 31, 2000 || Socorro || LINEAR ||  || align=right | 1.2 km || 
|-id=075 bgcolor=#fefefe
| 578075 ||  || — || November 25, 2013 || Haleakala || Pan-STARRS ||  || align=right data-sort-value="0.76" | 760 m || 
|-id=076 bgcolor=#E9E9E9
| 578076 ||  || — || September 24, 2009 || Mount Lemmon || Mount Lemmon Survey ||  || align=right | 3.0 km || 
|-id=077 bgcolor=#E9E9E9
| 578077 ||  || — || November 9, 2013 || Mount Lemmon || Mount Lemmon Survey ||  || align=right | 1.1 km || 
|-id=078 bgcolor=#E9E9E9
| 578078 ||  || — || April 13, 2011 || Kitt Peak || Spacewatch ||  || align=right | 1.7 km || 
|-id=079 bgcolor=#E9E9E9
| 578079 ||  || — || March 3, 2006 || Kitt Peak || Spacewatch ||  || align=right | 1.5 km || 
|-id=080 bgcolor=#E9E9E9
| 578080 ||  || — || November 25, 2013 || Haleakala || Pan-STARRS ||  || align=right | 1.2 km || 
|-id=081 bgcolor=#E9E9E9
| 578081 ||  || — || May 8, 2011 || Mayhill-ISON || L. Elenin ||  || align=right | 2.9 km || 
|-id=082 bgcolor=#E9E9E9
| 578082 ||  || — || September 28, 2008 || Catalina || CSS ||  || align=right | 3.0 km || 
|-id=083 bgcolor=#E9E9E9
| 578083 ||  || — || October 31, 2013 || Piszkesteto || K. Sárneczky || GEF || align=right | 1.6 km || 
|-id=084 bgcolor=#E9E9E9
| 578084 ||  || — || April 16, 2001 || Kitt Peak || Spacewatch || GEF || align=right | 1.2 km || 
|-id=085 bgcolor=#E9E9E9
| 578085 ||  || — || November 26, 2013 || Mount Lemmon || Mount Lemmon Survey ||  || align=right | 1.1 km || 
|-id=086 bgcolor=#E9E9E9
| 578086 ||  || — || November 26, 2013 || Haleakala || Pan-STARRS ||  || align=right | 1.3 km || 
|-id=087 bgcolor=#E9E9E9
| 578087 ||  || — || May 1, 2006 || Kitt Peak || D. E. Trilling ||  || align=right | 1.6 km || 
|-id=088 bgcolor=#E9E9E9
| 578088 ||  || — || October 2, 2008 || Mount Lemmon || Mount Lemmon Survey ||  || align=right | 2.5 km || 
|-id=089 bgcolor=#E9E9E9
| 578089 ||  || — || November 27, 2013 || Haleakala || Pan-STARRS ||  || align=right | 2.0 km || 
|-id=090 bgcolor=#E9E9E9
| 578090 ||  || — || November 28, 2013 || Haleakala || Pan-STARRS ||  || align=right | 2.4 km || 
|-id=091 bgcolor=#E9E9E9
| 578091 ||  || — || November 28, 2013 || Mount Lemmon || Mount Lemmon Survey ||  || align=right | 1.2 km || 
|-id=092 bgcolor=#E9E9E9
| 578092 ||  || — || October 26, 2008 || Mount Lemmon || Mount Lemmon Survey ||  || align=right | 1.7 km || 
|-id=093 bgcolor=#d6d6d6
| 578093 ||  || — || September 10, 2007 || Mount Lemmon || Mount Lemmon Survey ||  || align=right | 2.4 km || 
|-id=094 bgcolor=#fefefe
| 578094 ||  || — || November 25, 2013 || Haleakala || Pan-STARRS ||  || align=right data-sort-value="0.89" | 890 m || 
|-id=095 bgcolor=#E9E9E9
| 578095 ||  || — || February 17, 2001 || Haleakala || AMOS ||  || align=right | 2.8 km || 
|-id=096 bgcolor=#E9E9E9
| 578096 ||  || — || September 29, 2008 || Catalina || CSS ||  || align=right | 2.4 km || 
|-id=097 bgcolor=#fefefe
| 578097 ||  || — || October 25, 2013 || Kitt Peak || Spacewatch ||  || align=right data-sort-value="0.86" | 860 m || 
|-id=098 bgcolor=#E9E9E9
| 578098 ||  || — || October 30, 2013 || Haleakala || Pan-STARRS ||  || align=right data-sort-value="0.92" | 920 m || 
|-id=099 bgcolor=#E9E9E9
| 578099 ||  || — || November 26, 2013 || Nogales || M. Schwartz, P. R. Holvorcem ||  || align=right | 2.0 km || 
|-id=100 bgcolor=#E9E9E9
| 578100 ||  || — || October 14, 2013 || Mount Lemmon || Mount Lemmon Survey ||  || align=right | 2.0 km || 
|}

578101–578200 

|-bgcolor=#E9E9E9
| 578101 ||  || — || October 27, 2013 || Catalina || CSS ||  || align=right | 1.7 km || 
|-id=102 bgcolor=#E9E9E9
| 578102 ||  || — || November 16, 2009 || Mount Lemmon || Mount Lemmon Survey ||  || align=right | 1.8 km || 
|-id=103 bgcolor=#E9E9E9
| 578103 ||  || — || July 13, 2013 || Haleakala || Pan-STARRS ||  || align=right | 1.4 km || 
|-id=104 bgcolor=#E9E9E9
| 578104 ||  || — || October 30, 2013 || Haleakala || Pan-STARRS ||  || align=right data-sort-value="0.94" | 940 m || 
|-id=105 bgcolor=#E9E9E9
| 578105 ||  || — || October 26, 2013 || Mount Lemmon || Mount Lemmon Survey ||  || align=right | 1.8 km || 
|-id=106 bgcolor=#E9E9E9
| 578106 ||  || — || November 28, 2013 || Haleakala || Pan-STARRS ||  || align=right | 2.0 km || 
|-id=107 bgcolor=#fefefe
| 578107 ||  || — || October 28, 2005 || Catalina || CSS || H || align=right data-sort-value="0.62" | 620 m || 
|-id=108 bgcolor=#d6d6d6
| 578108 ||  || — || November 2, 2013 || Mount Lemmon || Mount Lemmon Survey ||  || align=right | 3.2 km || 
|-id=109 bgcolor=#E9E9E9
| 578109 ||  || — || January 4, 2001 || Haleakala || AMOS ||  || align=right | 1.5 km || 
|-id=110 bgcolor=#E9E9E9
| 578110 ||  || — || October 31, 2013 || Kitt Peak || Spacewatch ||  || align=right | 1.3 km || 
|-id=111 bgcolor=#E9E9E9
| 578111 ||  || — || November 26, 2013 || Haleakala || Pan-STARRS ||  || align=right | 1.4 km || 
|-id=112 bgcolor=#d6d6d6
| 578112 ||  || — || November 11, 2013 || Kitt Peak || Spacewatch ||  || align=right | 1.9 km || 
|-id=113 bgcolor=#E9E9E9
| 578113 ||  || — || March 23, 1995 || Kitt Peak || Spacewatch ||  || align=right | 1.3 km || 
|-id=114 bgcolor=#E9E9E9
| 578114 ||  || — || October 7, 2013 || Mount Lemmon || Mount Lemmon Survey ||  || align=right | 1.9 km || 
|-id=115 bgcolor=#d6d6d6
| 578115 ||  || — || November 1, 2013 || Kitt Peak || Spacewatch ||  || align=right | 2.0 km || 
|-id=116 bgcolor=#E9E9E9
| 578116 ||  || — || September 25, 2008 || Kitt Peak || Spacewatch ||  || align=right | 1.8 km || 
|-id=117 bgcolor=#E9E9E9
| 578117 ||  || — || November 27, 2013 || Kitt Peak || Spacewatch ||  || align=right | 2.0 km || 
|-id=118 bgcolor=#E9E9E9
| 578118 ||  || — || November 27, 2013 || Haleakala || Pan-STARRS ||  || align=right | 1.8 km || 
|-id=119 bgcolor=#E9E9E9
| 578119 ||  || — || May 21, 2012 || Haleakala || Pan-STARRS ||  || align=right | 1.0 km || 
|-id=120 bgcolor=#d6d6d6
| 578120 ||  || — || October 26, 2008 || Kitt Peak || Spacewatch ||  || align=right | 2.3 km || 
|-id=121 bgcolor=#d6d6d6
| 578121 ||  || — || November 27, 2013 || Haleakala || Pan-STARRS ||  || align=right | 2.5 km || 
|-id=122 bgcolor=#E9E9E9
| 578122 ||  || — || September 24, 2008 || Kitt Peak || Spacewatch ||  || align=right | 1.7 km || 
|-id=123 bgcolor=#E9E9E9
| 578123 ||  || — || October 14, 2013 || Mount Lemmon || Mount Lemmon Survey ||  || align=right | 1.5 km || 
|-id=124 bgcolor=#E9E9E9
| 578124 ||  || — || September 21, 2008 || Mount Lemmon || Mount Lemmon Survey ||  || align=right | 2.3 km || 
|-id=125 bgcolor=#E9E9E9
| 578125 ||  || — || November 28, 2013 || Mount Lemmon || Mount Lemmon Survey ||  || align=right | 1.9 km || 
|-id=126 bgcolor=#E9E9E9
| 578126 ||  || — || November 28, 2013 || Mount Lemmon || Mount Lemmon Survey ||  || align=right | 1.3 km || 
|-id=127 bgcolor=#C2FFFF
| 578127 ||  || — || October 10, 2012 || Mount Lemmon || Mount Lemmon Survey || L5 || align=right | 8.8 km || 
|-id=128 bgcolor=#E9E9E9
| 578128 ||  || — || September 15, 2004 || Siding Spring || SSS ||  || align=right | 1.5 km || 
|-id=129 bgcolor=#E9E9E9
| 578129 ||  || — || October 10, 2004 || Kitt Peak || Spacewatch ||  || align=right | 1.5 km || 
|-id=130 bgcolor=#E9E9E9
| 578130 ||  || — || October 10, 2008 || Mount Lemmon || Mount Lemmon Survey ||  || align=right | 1.9 km || 
|-id=131 bgcolor=#E9E9E9
| 578131 ||  || — || July 28, 2012 || Haleakala || Pan-STARRS ||  || align=right | 1.8 km || 
|-id=132 bgcolor=#E9E9E9
| 578132 ||  || — || October 26, 2013 || Palomar || PTF ||  || align=right | 1.5 km || 
|-id=133 bgcolor=#E9E9E9
| 578133 ||  || — || November 19, 1996 || Kitt Peak || Spacewatch ||  || align=right | 1.2 km || 
|-id=134 bgcolor=#E9E9E9
| 578134 ||  || — || October 7, 2004 || Socorro || LINEAR ||  || align=right | 1.6 km || 
|-id=135 bgcolor=#E9E9E9
| 578135 ||  || — || September 14, 2004 || Palomar || NEAT || MAR || align=right | 1.4 km || 
|-id=136 bgcolor=#E9E9E9
| 578136 ||  || — || August 7, 2004 || Palomar || NEAT ||  || align=right | 1.5 km || 
|-id=137 bgcolor=#d6d6d6
| 578137 ||  || — || November 28, 2013 || Mount Lemmon || Mount Lemmon Survey ||  || align=right | 2.7 km || 
|-id=138 bgcolor=#E9E9E9
| 578138 ||  || — || November 26, 2013 || Haleakala || Pan-STARRS ||  || align=right | 1.5 km || 
|-id=139 bgcolor=#d6d6d6
| 578139 ||  || — || November 14, 2007 || Mount Lemmon || Mount Lemmon Survey ||  || align=right | 2.7 km || 
|-id=140 bgcolor=#d6d6d6
| 578140 ||  || — || January 20, 2009 || Catalina || CSS ||  || align=right | 3.3 km || 
|-id=141 bgcolor=#E9E9E9
| 578141 ||  || — || August 21, 2004 || Siding Spring || SSS ||  || align=right | 1.7 km || 
|-id=142 bgcolor=#E9E9E9
| 578142 ||  || — || January 29, 2015 || Haleakala || Pan-STARRS ||  || align=right | 1.7 km || 
|-id=143 bgcolor=#E9E9E9
| 578143 ||  || — || November 28, 2013 || Haleakala || Pan-STARRS ||  || align=right | 1.1 km || 
|-id=144 bgcolor=#d6d6d6
| 578144 ||  || — || January 16, 2015 || Haleakala || Pan-STARRS ||  || align=right | 2.2 km || 
|-id=145 bgcolor=#E9E9E9
| 578145 ||  || — || February 17, 2015 || Haleakala || Pan-STARRS ||  || align=right | 1.7 km || 
|-id=146 bgcolor=#E9E9E9
| 578146 ||  || — || November 26, 2013 || Mount Lemmon || Mount Lemmon Survey ||  || align=right | 1.2 km || 
|-id=147 bgcolor=#fefefe
| 578147 ||  || — || November 28, 2013 || Mount Lemmon || Mount Lemmon Survey ||  || align=right data-sort-value="0.65" | 650 m || 
|-id=148 bgcolor=#E9E9E9
| 578148 ||  || — || April 16, 2016 || Haleakala || Pan-STARRS ||  || align=right | 1.2 km || 
|-id=149 bgcolor=#d6d6d6
| 578149 ||  || — || November 26, 2013 || Mount Lemmon || Mount Lemmon Survey ||  || align=right | 1.9 km || 
|-id=150 bgcolor=#d6d6d6
| 578150 ||  || — || February 20, 2015 || Haleakala || Pan-STARRS ||  || align=right | 1.8 km || 
|-id=151 bgcolor=#E9E9E9
| 578151 ||  || — || November 27, 2013 || Haleakala || Pan-STARRS ||  || align=right | 1.4 km || 
|-id=152 bgcolor=#d6d6d6
| 578152 ||  || — || November 29, 2013 || Haleakala || Pan-STARRS ||  || align=right | 2.0 km || 
|-id=153 bgcolor=#E9E9E9
| 578153 ||  || — || November 26, 2013 || Mount Lemmon || Mount Lemmon Survey ||  || align=right | 1.6 km || 
|-id=154 bgcolor=#E9E9E9
| 578154 ||  || — || November 27, 2013 || Haleakala || Pan-STARRS ||  || align=right | 1.1 km || 
|-id=155 bgcolor=#d6d6d6
| 578155 ||  || — || November 24, 2013 || Haleakala || Pan-STARRS ||  || align=right | 2.7 km || 
|-id=156 bgcolor=#E9E9E9
| 578156 ||  || — || November 26, 2013 || Haleakala || Pan-STARRS ||  || align=right | 1.8 km || 
|-id=157 bgcolor=#E9E9E9
| 578157 ||  || — || November 28, 2013 || Mount Lemmon || Mount Lemmon Survey ||  || align=right | 1.2 km || 
|-id=158 bgcolor=#E9E9E9
| 578158 ||  || — || November 26, 2013 || Haleakala || Pan-STARRS ||  || align=right | 2.0 km || 
|-id=159 bgcolor=#E9E9E9
| 578159 ||  || — || November 27, 2013 || Haleakala || Pan-STARRS ||  || align=right | 1.7 km || 
|-id=160 bgcolor=#fefefe
| 578160 ||  || — || November 28, 2013 || Mount Lemmon || Mount Lemmon Survey ||  || align=right data-sort-value="0.52" | 520 m || 
|-id=161 bgcolor=#E9E9E9
| 578161 ||  || — || November 27, 2013 || Haleakala || Pan-STARRS ||  || align=right | 1.6 km || 
|-id=162 bgcolor=#d6d6d6
| 578162 ||  || — || November 28, 2013 || Mount Lemmon || Mount Lemmon Survey || 7:4 || align=right | 2.8 km || 
|-id=163 bgcolor=#E9E9E9
| 578163 ||  || — || December 11, 2004 || Kitt Peak || Spacewatch ||  || align=right | 2.2 km || 
|-id=164 bgcolor=#E9E9E9
| 578164 Rerrichbéla ||  ||  || December 1, 2013 || Piszkesteto || K. Sárneczky, P. Székely ||  || align=right | 1.2 km || 
|-id=165 bgcolor=#E9E9E9
| 578165 ||  || — || November 9, 2013 || Mount Lemmon || Mount Lemmon Survey ||  || align=right | 2.5 km || 
|-id=166 bgcolor=#E9E9E9
| 578166 ||  || — || December 3, 2013 || Haleakala || Pan-STARRS ||  || align=right | 1.7 km || 
|-id=167 bgcolor=#fefefe
| 578167 ||  || — || November 27, 2013 || Haleakala || Pan-STARRS ||  || align=right data-sort-value="0.65" | 650 m || 
|-id=168 bgcolor=#E9E9E9
| 578168 ||  || — || December 1, 2013 || XuYi || PMO NEO ||  || align=right | 1.3 km || 
|-id=169 bgcolor=#E9E9E9
| 578169 ||  || — || July 15, 2004 || Siding Spring || SSS ||  || align=right | 1.3 km || 
|-id=170 bgcolor=#d6d6d6
| 578170 ||  || — || January 25, 2003 || Palomar || NEAT ||  || align=right | 4.6 km || 
|-id=171 bgcolor=#d6d6d6
| 578171 ||  || — || December 6, 2013 || Nogales || M. Schwartz, P. R. Holvorcem ||  || align=right | 3.9 km || 
|-id=172 bgcolor=#E9E9E9
| 578172 ||  || — || November 2, 2013 || Mount Lemmon || Mount Lemmon Survey ||  || align=right | 1.9 km || 
|-id=173 bgcolor=#E9E9E9
| 578173 ||  || — || November 27, 2013 || Haleakala || Pan-STARRS ||  || align=right | 1.2 km || 
|-id=174 bgcolor=#E9E9E9
| 578174 ||  || — || November 2, 2013 || Mount Lemmon || Mount Lemmon Survey ||  || align=right | 1.3 km || 
|-id=175 bgcolor=#E9E9E9
| 578175 ||  || — || December 4, 2013 || Nogales || M. Schwartz, P. R. Holvorcem ||  || align=right | 1.8 km || 
|-id=176 bgcolor=#E9E9E9
| 578176 ||  || — || September 21, 2008 || Catalina || CSS ||  || align=right | 1.8 km || 
|-id=177 bgcolor=#E9E9E9
| 578177 ||  || — || November 7, 2008 || Mount Lemmon || Mount Lemmon Survey ||  || align=right | 3.0 km || 
|-id=178 bgcolor=#E9E9E9
| 578178 ||  || — || January 5, 2000 || Socorro || LINEAR ||  || align=right | 2.0 km || 
|-id=179 bgcolor=#E9E9E9
| 578179 ||  || — || September 17, 2003 || Kitt Peak || Spacewatch ||  || align=right | 2.9 km || 
|-id=180 bgcolor=#d6d6d6
| 578180 ||  || — || May 28, 2000 || Socorro || LINEAR ||  || align=right | 3.0 km || 
|-id=181 bgcolor=#E9E9E9
| 578181 ||  || — || September 18, 2003 || Kitt Peak || Spacewatch ||  || align=right | 1.8 km || 
|-id=182 bgcolor=#d6d6d6
| 578182 ||  || — || December 18, 2007 || Mount Lemmon || Mount Lemmon Survey ||  || align=right | 3.1 km || 
|-id=183 bgcolor=#d6d6d6
| 578183 ||  || — || October 7, 2012 || Haleakala || Pan-STARRS ||  || align=right | 2.5 km || 
|-id=184 bgcolor=#d6d6d6
| 578184 ||  || — || December 10, 2013 || Mount Lemmon || Mount Lemmon Survey ||  || align=right | 2.7 km || 
|-id=185 bgcolor=#E9E9E9
| 578185 ||  || — || December 7, 2013 || Mount Lemmon || Mount Lemmon Survey ||  || align=right | 1.7 km || 
|-id=186 bgcolor=#E9E9E9
| 578186 ||  || — || December 11, 2013 || Haleakala || Pan-STARRS ||  || align=right | 1.5 km || 
|-id=187 bgcolor=#d6d6d6
| 578187 ||  || — || December 11, 2013 || Haleakala || Pan-STARRS ||  || align=right | 2.1 km || 
|-id=188 bgcolor=#E9E9E9
| 578188 ||  || — || January 21, 2015 || Haleakala || Pan-STARRS ||  || align=right | 1.6 km || 
|-id=189 bgcolor=#d6d6d6
| 578189 ||  || — || December 11, 2013 || Haleakala || Pan-STARRS ||  || align=right | 2.9 km || 
|-id=190 bgcolor=#d6d6d6
| 578190 ||  || — || December 14, 2013 || Mount Lemmon || Mount Lemmon Survey ||  || align=right | 2.1 km || 
|-id=191 bgcolor=#E9E9E9
| 578191 ||  || — || December 6, 2005 || Kitt Peak || Spacewatch ||  || align=right | 1.5 km || 
|-id=192 bgcolor=#E9E9E9
| 578192 ||  || — || October 3, 2013 || Mount Lemmon || Mount Lemmon Survey ||  || align=right | 1.4 km || 
|-id=193 bgcolor=#E9E9E9
| 578193 ||  || — || November 27, 2013 || Haleakala || Pan-STARRS ||  || align=right | 1.0 km || 
|-id=194 bgcolor=#E9E9E9
| 578194 ||  || — || October 26, 2008 || Mount Lemmon || Mount Lemmon Survey ||  || align=right | 1.9 km || 
|-id=195 bgcolor=#E9E9E9
| 578195 ||  || — || September 24, 2008 || Kitt Peak || Spacewatch ||  || align=right | 1.9 km || 
|-id=196 bgcolor=#E9E9E9
| 578196 ||  || — || December 25, 2013 || Haleakala || Pan-STARRS ||  || align=right | 2.3 km || 
|-id=197 bgcolor=#d6d6d6
| 578197 ||  || — || December 25, 2013 || Mount Lemmon || Mount Lemmon Survey ||  || align=right | 2.6 km || 
|-id=198 bgcolor=#E9E9E9
| 578198 ||  || — || December 24, 2013 || Mount Lemmon || Mount Lemmon Survey ||  || align=right | 2.1 km || 
|-id=199 bgcolor=#E9E9E9
| 578199 ||  || — || September 27, 2008 || Mount Lemmon || Mount Lemmon Survey ||  || align=right | 1.1 km || 
|-id=200 bgcolor=#E9E9E9
| 578200 ||  || — || March 10, 2002 || Kitt Peak || Spacewatch ||  || align=right data-sort-value="0.78" | 780 m || 
|}

578201–578300 

|-bgcolor=#E9E9E9
| 578201 ||  || — || October 9, 2008 || Kitt Peak || Spacewatch ||  || align=right | 1.7 km || 
|-id=202 bgcolor=#E9E9E9
| 578202 ||  || — || December 25, 2013 || Nogales || J.-C. Merlin ||  || align=right | 2.3 km || 
|-id=203 bgcolor=#E9E9E9
| 578203 ||  || — || January 25, 2006 || Kitt Peak || Spacewatch ||  || align=right | 1.2 km || 
|-id=204 bgcolor=#E9E9E9
| 578204 ||  || — || October 31, 2013 || Kitt Peak || Spacewatch ||  || align=right | 1.7 km || 
|-id=205 bgcolor=#E9E9E9
| 578205 ||  || — || October 26, 2013 || Mount Lemmon || Mount Lemmon Survey ||  || align=right | 2.3 km || 
|-id=206 bgcolor=#d6d6d6
| 578206 ||  || — || November 7, 2013 || Kitt Peak || Spacewatch ||  || align=right | 3.1 km || 
|-id=207 bgcolor=#E9E9E9
| 578207 ||  || — || December 23, 2013 || Mount Lemmon || Mount Lemmon Survey ||  || align=right | 2.5 km || 
|-id=208 bgcolor=#d6d6d6
| 578208 ||  || — || December 13, 2013 || Mount Lemmon || Mount Lemmon Survey ||  || align=right | 3.7 km || 
|-id=209 bgcolor=#E9E9E9
| 578209 ||  || — || February 15, 2010 || Palomar || PTF ||  || align=right | 2.4 km || 
|-id=210 bgcolor=#E9E9E9
| 578210 ||  || — || December 25, 2013 || Kitt Peak || Spacewatch ||  || align=right | 1.6 km || 
|-id=211 bgcolor=#E9E9E9
| 578211 ||  || — || March 8, 2005 || Mount Lemmon || Mount Lemmon Survey ||  || align=right | 1.7 km || 
|-id=212 bgcolor=#d6d6d6
| 578212 ||  || — || November 8, 2013 || Mount Lemmon || Mount Lemmon Survey ||  || align=right | 2.9 km || 
|-id=213 bgcolor=#d6d6d6
| 578213 ||  || — || March 18, 2010 || Kitt Peak || Spacewatch ||  || align=right | 2.7 km || 
|-id=214 bgcolor=#E9E9E9
| 578214 ||  || — || May 27, 2011 || Kitt Peak || Spacewatch ||  || align=right | 2.2 km || 
|-id=215 bgcolor=#E9E9E9
| 578215 ||  || — || October 28, 2013 || Mount Lemmon || Mount Lemmon Survey ||  || align=right | 1.6 km || 
|-id=216 bgcolor=#E9E9E9
| 578216 ||  || — || October 7, 2008 || Mount Lemmon || Mount Lemmon Survey ||  || align=right | 2.0 km || 
|-id=217 bgcolor=#E9E9E9
| 578217 ||  || — || October 23, 2013 || Haleakala || Pan-STARRS ||  || align=right | 1.6 km || 
|-id=218 bgcolor=#E9E9E9
| 578218 ||  || — || November 27, 2013 || Haleakala || Pan-STARRS ||  || align=right data-sort-value="0.91" | 910 m || 
|-id=219 bgcolor=#E9E9E9
| 578219 ||  || — || November 27, 2013 || Haleakala || Pan-STARRS ||  || align=right | 1.1 km || 
|-id=220 bgcolor=#E9E9E9
| 578220 ||  || — || January 6, 2010 || Kitt Peak || Spacewatch ||  || align=right | 1.8 km || 
|-id=221 bgcolor=#E9E9E9
| 578221 ||  || — || November 28, 2013 || Mount Lemmon || Mount Lemmon Survey ||  || align=right | 1.8 km || 
|-id=222 bgcolor=#d6d6d6
| 578222 ||  || — || December 4, 2013 || Haleakala || Pan-STARRS ||  || align=right | 2.7 km || 
|-id=223 bgcolor=#E9E9E9
| 578223 ||  || — || October 7, 2008 || Mount Lemmon || Mount Lemmon Survey ||  || align=right | 1.9 km || 
|-id=224 bgcolor=#d6d6d6
| 578224 ||  || — || April 11, 2010 || Mount Lemmon || Mount Lemmon Survey ||  || align=right | 1.9 km || 
|-id=225 bgcolor=#E9E9E9
| 578225 ||  || — || October 26, 2008 || Catalina || CSS ||  || align=right | 1.4 km || 
|-id=226 bgcolor=#E9E9E9
| 578226 ||  || — || January 23, 2006 || Kitt Peak || Spacewatch ||  || align=right data-sort-value="0.91" | 910 m || 
|-id=227 bgcolor=#d6d6d6
| 578227 ||  || — || November 8, 2007 || Kitt Peak || Spacewatch ||  || align=right | 2.5 km || 
|-id=228 bgcolor=#E9E9E9
| 578228 ||  || — || April 15, 2010 || WISE || WISE ||  || align=right data-sort-value="0.87" | 870 m || 
|-id=229 bgcolor=#E9E9E9
| 578229 ||  || — || December 1, 2013 || XuYi || PMO NEO ||  || align=right | 1.9 km || 
|-id=230 bgcolor=#fefefe
| 578230 ||  || — || August 29, 2009 || Kitt Peak || Spacewatch ||  || align=right data-sort-value="0.65" | 650 m || 
|-id=231 bgcolor=#E9E9E9
| 578231 ||  || — || September 18, 2012 || Mount Lemmon || Mount Lemmon Survey ||  || align=right | 1.8 km || 
|-id=232 bgcolor=#d6d6d6
| 578232 ||  || — || December 27, 2013 || Kitt Peak || Spacewatch ||  || align=right | 2.8 km || 
|-id=233 bgcolor=#d6d6d6
| 578233 ||  || — || December 27, 2013 || Piszkesteto || K. Sárneczky ||  || align=right | 2.8 km || 
|-id=234 bgcolor=#d6d6d6
| 578234 ||  || — || September 22, 2012 || Kitt Peak || Spacewatch ||  || align=right | 1.8 km || 
|-id=235 bgcolor=#E9E9E9
| 578235 ||  || — || November 26, 2013 || Mount Lemmon || Mount Lemmon Survey ||  || align=right | 1.9 km || 
|-id=236 bgcolor=#E9E9E9
| 578236 ||  || — || December 30, 2013 || Mount Lemmon || Mount Lemmon Survey ||  || align=right | 1.8 km || 
|-id=237 bgcolor=#E9E9E9
| 578237 ||  || — || December 30, 2013 || Mount Lemmon || Mount Lemmon Survey ||  || align=right | 1.7 km || 
|-id=238 bgcolor=#fefefe
| 578238 ||  || — || December 30, 2013 || Mount Lemmon || Mount Lemmon Survey ||  || align=right data-sort-value="0.68" | 680 m || 
|-id=239 bgcolor=#E9E9E9
| 578239 ||  || — || October 5, 2013 || Kitt Peak || Spacewatch ||  || align=right | 1.3 km || 
|-id=240 bgcolor=#E9E9E9
| 578240 ||  || — || November 27, 2013 || Haleakala || Pan-STARRS ||  || align=right | 1.5 km || 
|-id=241 bgcolor=#E9E9E9
| 578241 ||  || — || February 24, 2006 || Catalina || CSS ||  || align=right | 2.4 km || 
|-id=242 bgcolor=#d6d6d6
| 578242 ||  || — || November 28, 2013 || Mount Lemmon || Mount Lemmon Survey ||  || align=right | 2.4 km || 
|-id=243 bgcolor=#fefefe
| 578243 ||  || — || December 25, 2013 || Kitt Peak || Spacewatch ||  || align=right data-sort-value="0.68" | 680 m || 
|-id=244 bgcolor=#E9E9E9
| 578244 ||  || — || October 20, 2003 || Palomar || NEAT ||  || align=right | 3.0 km || 
|-id=245 bgcolor=#E9E9E9
| 578245 ||  || — || October 20, 2012 || Mount Lemmon || Mount Lemmon Survey ||  || align=right | 1.6 km || 
|-id=246 bgcolor=#d6d6d6
| 578246 ||  || — || October 11, 2012 || Piszkesteto || K. Sárneczky ||  || align=right | 3.7 km || 
|-id=247 bgcolor=#E9E9E9
| 578247 ||  || — || October 10, 2012 || Mount Lemmon || Mount Lemmon Survey ||  || align=right | 2.4 km || 
|-id=248 bgcolor=#d6d6d6
| 578248 ||  || — || December 28, 2013 || Kitt Peak || Spacewatch ||  || align=right | 2.2 km || 
|-id=249 bgcolor=#d6d6d6
| 578249 ||  || — || March 16, 2004 || Mauna Kea || Mauna Kea Obs. || EOS || align=right | 1.6 km || 
|-id=250 bgcolor=#E9E9E9
| 578250 ||  || — || December 28, 2013 || Kitt Peak || Spacewatch ||  || align=right | 1.9 km || 
|-id=251 bgcolor=#E9E9E9
| 578251 ||  || — || December 28, 2013 || Kitt Peak || Spacewatch ||  || align=right | 1.9 km || 
|-id=252 bgcolor=#d6d6d6
| 578252 ||  || — || December 28, 2013 || Kitt Peak || Spacewatch ||  || align=right | 3.2 km || 
|-id=253 bgcolor=#E9E9E9
| 578253 ||  || — || December 28, 2013 || Kitt Peak || Spacewatch ||  || align=right | 1.7 km || 
|-id=254 bgcolor=#d6d6d6
| 578254 ||  || — || February 17, 2004 || Kitt Peak || Spacewatch ||  || align=right | 2.4 km || 
|-id=255 bgcolor=#d6d6d6
| 578255 ||  || — || July 21, 2006 || Mount Lemmon || Mount Lemmon Survey || EOS || align=right | 2.4 km || 
|-id=256 bgcolor=#fefefe
| 578256 ||  || — || February 7, 2011 || Mount Lemmon || Mount Lemmon Survey ||  || align=right data-sort-value="0.68" | 680 m || 
|-id=257 bgcolor=#d6d6d6
| 578257 ||  || — || October 19, 2012 || Mount Lemmon || Mount Lemmon Survey || EOS || align=right | 2.3 km || 
|-id=258 bgcolor=#fefefe
| 578258 ||  || — || December 30, 2013 || Haleakala || Pan-STARRS ||  || align=right data-sort-value="0.86" | 860 m || 
|-id=259 bgcolor=#d6d6d6
| 578259 ||  || — || December 31, 2013 || Mount Lemmon || Mount Lemmon Survey ||  || align=right | 2.5 km || 
|-id=260 bgcolor=#E9E9E9
| 578260 ||  || — || September 21, 2003 || Kitt Peak || Spacewatch ||  || align=right | 1.5 km || 
|-id=261 bgcolor=#E9E9E9
| 578261 ||  || — || September 8, 2012 || Bergisch Gladbach || W. Bickel ||  || align=right | 2.3 km || 
|-id=262 bgcolor=#E9E9E9
| 578262 ||  || — || December 27, 2013 || Mount Lemmon || Mount Lemmon Survey ||  || align=right | 2.7 km || 
|-id=263 bgcolor=#fefefe
| 578263 ||  || — || August 15, 2009 || Kitt Peak || Spacewatch ||  || align=right data-sort-value="0.82" | 820 m || 
|-id=264 bgcolor=#E9E9E9
| 578264 ||  || — || December 19, 2009 || Mount Lemmon || Mount Lemmon Survey ||  || align=right | 1.6 km || 
|-id=265 bgcolor=#E9E9E9
| 578265 ||  || — || December 11, 2013 || Haleakala || Pan-STARRS ||  || align=right | 1.3 km || 
|-id=266 bgcolor=#d6d6d6
| 578266 ||  || — || November 24, 2008 || Kitt Peak || Spacewatch ||  || align=right | 2.0 km || 
|-id=267 bgcolor=#d6d6d6
| 578267 ||  || — || December 27, 2013 || Kitt Peak || Spacewatch || EOS || align=right | 1.7 km || 
|-id=268 bgcolor=#E9E9E9
| 578268 ||  || — || December 29, 2013 || Haleakala || Pan-STARRS ||  || align=right | 1.4 km || 
|-id=269 bgcolor=#d6d6d6
| 578269 ||  || — || March 17, 2004 || Kitt Peak || Spacewatch ||  || align=right | 2.1 km || 
|-id=270 bgcolor=#E9E9E9
| 578270 ||  || — || January 18, 2004 || Palomar || NEAT ||  || align=right | 2.8 km || 
|-id=271 bgcolor=#d6d6d6
| 578271 ||  || — || December 30, 2013 || Mount Lemmon || Mount Lemmon Survey ||  || align=right | 3.5 km || 
|-id=272 bgcolor=#E9E9E9
| 578272 ||  || — || October 1, 2003 || Kitt Peak || Spacewatch ||  || align=right | 2.3 km || 
|-id=273 bgcolor=#d6d6d6
| 578273 ||  || — || December 30, 2013 || Haleakala || Pan-STARRS ||  || align=right | 2.1 km || 
|-id=274 bgcolor=#E9E9E9
| 578274 ||  || — || December 31, 2013 || Mount Lemmon || Mount Lemmon Survey ||  || align=right | 2.8 km || 
|-id=275 bgcolor=#d6d6d6
| 578275 ||  || — || September 14, 2007 || Kitt Peak || Spacewatch ||  || align=right | 2.1 km || 
|-id=276 bgcolor=#E9E9E9
| 578276 ||  || — || October 28, 2008 || Kitt Peak || Spacewatch ||  || align=right | 1.5 km || 
|-id=277 bgcolor=#d6d6d6
| 578277 ||  || — || September 21, 2012 || Mount Lemmon || Mount Lemmon Survey ||  || align=right | 2.4 km || 
|-id=278 bgcolor=#E9E9E9
| 578278 ||  || — || August 14, 2012 || Siding Spring || SSS ||  || align=right | 2.3 km || 
|-id=279 bgcolor=#E9E9E9
| 578279 ||  || — || April 24, 2007 || Mount Lemmon || Mount Lemmon Survey ||  || align=right | 1.6 km || 
|-id=280 bgcolor=#d6d6d6
| 578280 ||  || — || December 30, 2013 || Mount Lemmon || Mount Lemmon Survey ||  || align=right | 1.7 km || 
|-id=281 bgcolor=#E9E9E9
| 578281 ||  || — || December 11, 2013 || Haleakala || Pan-STARRS ||  || align=right | 1.5 km || 
|-id=282 bgcolor=#d6d6d6
| 578282 ||  || — || September 20, 2011 || Haleakala || Pan-STARRS ||  || align=right | 3.4 km || 
|-id=283 bgcolor=#d6d6d6
| 578283 ||  || — || December 31, 2013 || Haleakala || Pan-STARRS ||  || align=right | 3.1 km || 
|-id=284 bgcolor=#E9E9E9
| 578284 ||  || — || October 22, 2003 || Kitt Peak || Spacewatch ||  || align=right | 1.9 km || 
|-id=285 bgcolor=#E9E9E9
| 578285 ||  || — || December 31, 2013 || Kitt Peak || Spacewatch ||  || align=right | 2.0 km || 
|-id=286 bgcolor=#E9E9E9
| 578286 ||  || — || May 22, 2015 || Haleakala || Pan-STARRS ||  || align=right | 1.3 km || 
|-id=287 bgcolor=#d6d6d6
| 578287 ||  || — || January 16, 2015 || Haleakala || Pan-STARRS ||  || align=right | 3.4 km || 
|-id=288 bgcolor=#E9E9E9
| 578288 ||  || — || May 1, 2016 || Haleakala || Pan-STARRS ||  || align=right | 1.6 km || 
|-id=289 bgcolor=#d6d6d6
| 578289 ||  || — || December 23, 2013 || Mount Lemmon || Mount Lemmon Survey ||  || align=right | 1.7 km || 
|-id=290 bgcolor=#E9E9E9
| 578290 ||  || — || October 11, 2017 || Catalina || CSS ||  || align=right | 3.3 km || 
|-id=291 bgcolor=#d6d6d6
| 578291 ||  || — || January 23, 2015 || Haleakala || Pan-STARRS ||  || align=right | 2.3 km || 
|-id=292 bgcolor=#E9E9E9
| 578292 ||  || — || December 31, 2013 || Haleakala || Pan-STARRS ||  || align=right | 2.2 km || 
|-id=293 bgcolor=#d6d6d6
| 578293 ||  || — || December 31, 2013 || Haleakala || Pan-STARRS ||  || align=right | 2.0 km || 
|-id=294 bgcolor=#d6d6d6
| 578294 ||  || — || December 25, 2013 || Mount Lemmon || Mount Lemmon Survey ||  || align=right | 2.5 km || 
|-id=295 bgcolor=#E9E9E9
| 578295 ||  || — || December 26, 2013 || Mount Lemmon || Mount Lemmon Survey ||  || align=right | 1.6 km || 
|-id=296 bgcolor=#d6d6d6
| 578296 ||  || — || December 25, 2013 || Mount Lemmon || Mount Lemmon Survey ||  || align=right | 1.8 km || 
|-id=297 bgcolor=#d6d6d6
| 578297 ||  || — || February 22, 2004 || Kitt Peak || Spacewatch ||  || align=right | 2.5 km || 
|-id=298 bgcolor=#E9E9E9
| 578298 ||  || — || January 1, 2014 || Haleakala || Pan-STARRS ||  || align=right | 1.9 km || 
|-id=299 bgcolor=#E9E9E9
| 578299 ||  || — || August 20, 2003 || Campo Imperatore || CINEOS ||  || align=right | 2.2 km || 
|-id=300 bgcolor=#d6d6d6
| 578300 ||  || — || November 18, 2008 || Kitt Peak || Spacewatch ||  || align=right | 2.1 km || 
|}

578301–578400 

|-bgcolor=#fefefe
| 578301 ||  || — || January 1, 2014 || Haleakala || Pan-STARRS ||  || align=right data-sort-value="0.71" | 710 m || 
|-id=302 bgcolor=#d6d6d6
| 578302 ||  || — || September 12, 2001 || Kitt Peak || L. H. Wasserman, E. L. Ryan ||  || align=right | 2.1 km || 
|-id=303 bgcolor=#d6d6d6
| 578303 ||  || — || February 21, 2009 || Mount Lemmon || Mount Lemmon Survey ||  || align=right | 1.9 km || 
|-id=304 bgcolor=#d6d6d6
| 578304 ||  || — || October 18, 2012 || Haleakala || Pan-STARRS ||  || align=right | 2.1 km || 
|-id=305 bgcolor=#E9E9E9
| 578305 ||  || — || September 24, 2008 || Mount Lemmon || Mount Lemmon Survey ||  || align=right | 2.0 km || 
|-id=306 bgcolor=#E9E9E9
| 578306 ||  || — || December 31, 2008 || Mount Lemmon || Mount Lemmon Survey ||  || align=right | 1.9 km || 
|-id=307 bgcolor=#d6d6d6
| 578307 ||  || — || February 24, 2003 || Haleakala || AMOS ||  || align=right | 3.4 km || 
|-id=308 bgcolor=#E9E9E9
| 578308 ||  || — || October 21, 2008 || Mount Lemmon || Mount Lemmon Survey ||  || align=right | 1.9 km || 
|-id=309 bgcolor=#d6d6d6
| 578309 ||  || — || September 18, 2012 || Mount Lemmon || Mount Lemmon Survey ||  || align=right | 1.8 km || 
|-id=310 bgcolor=#d6d6d6
| 578310 ||  || — || January 1, 2014 || Mount Lemmon || Mount Lemmon Survey ||  || align=right | 2.3 km || 
|-id=311 bgcolor=#E9E9E9
| 578311 ||  || — || January 3, 2014 || Mount Lemmon || Mount Lemmon Survey ||  || align=right | 1.4 km || 
|-id=312 bgcolor=#E9E9E9
| 578312 ||  || — || October 23, 2008 || Mount Lemmon || Mount Lemmon Survey ||  || align=right | 1.9 km || 
|-id=313 bgcolor=#E9E9E9
| 578313 ||  || — || January 3, 2014 || Kitt Peak || Spacewatch ||  || align=right data-sort-value="0.91" | 910 m || 
|-id=314 bgcolor=#d6d6d6
| 578314 ||  || — || January 3, 2014 || Kitt Peak || Spacewatch ||  || align=right | 3.5 km || 
|-id=315 bgcolor=#E9E9E9
| 578315 ||  || — || January 3, 2014 || Mount Lemmon || Mount Lemmon Survey ||  || align=right | 2.0 km || 
|-id=316 bgcolor=#d6d6d6
| 578316 ||  || — || January 20, 2009 || Kitt Peak || Spacewatch ||  || align=right | 2.3 km || 
|-id=317 bgcolor=#d6d6d6
| 578317 ||  || — || December 4, 2007 || Mount Lemmon || Mount Lemmon Survey ||  || align=right | 3.1 km || 
|-id=318 bgcolor=#d6d6d6
| 578318 ||  || — || February 9, 2003 || Kitt Peak || Spacewatch ||  || align=right | 3.3 km || 
|-id=319 bgcolor=#d6d6d6
| 578319 ||  || — || August 2, 2011 || Haleakala || Pan-STARRS ||  || align=right | 3.7 km || 
|-id=320 bgcolor=#FA8072
| 578320 ||  || — || January 7, 2014 || Haleakala || Pan-STARRS || H || align=right data-sort-value="0.73" | 730 m || 
|-id=321 bgcolor=#d6d6d6
| 578321 ||  || — || November 20, 2008 || Kitt Peak || Spacewatch ||  || align=right | 2.2 km || 
|-id=322 bgcolor=#E9E9E9
| 578322 ||  || — || January 2, 2014 || Mount Lemmon || Mount Lemmon Survey ||  || align=right data-sort-value="0.99" | 990 m || 
|-id=323 bgcolor=#E9E9E9
| 578323 ||  || — || January 2, 2014 || Mount Lemmon || Mount Lemmon Survey ||  || align=right | 1.7 km || 
|-id=324 bgcolor=#E9E9E9
| 578324 ||  || — || September 20, 2003 || Kitt Peak || Spacewatch ||  || align=right | 2.4 km || 
|-id=325 bgcolor=#d6d6d6
| 578325 ||  || — || January 20, 2009 || Kitt Peak || Spacewatch ||  || align=right | 2.0 km || 
|-id=326 bgcolor=#E9E9E9
| 578326 ||  || — || February 16, 2010 || Mount Lemmon || Mount Lemmon Survey ||  || align=right data-sort-value="0.79" | 790 m || 
|-id=327 bgcolor=#E9E9E9
| 578327 ||  || — || November 28, 2013 || Kitt Peak || Spacewatch ||  || align=right | 2.1 km || 
|-id=328 bgcolor=#E9E9E9
| 578328 ||  || — || December 31, 2013 || Mount Lemmon || Mount Lemmon Survey ||  || align=right | 1.4 km || 
|-id=329 bgcolor=#d6d6d6
| 578329 ||  || — || January 26, 2003 || Palomar || NEAT ||  || align=right | 3.3 km || 
|-id=330 bgcolor=#d6d6d6
| 578330 ||  || — || January 7, 2014 || Kitt Peak || Spacewatch ||  || align=right | 1.9 km || 
|-id=331 bgcolor=#d6d6d6
| 578331 ||  || — || December 28, 2013 || Kitt Peak || Spacewatch ||  || align=right | 2.0 km || 
|-id=332 bgcolor=#d6d6d6
| 578332 ||  || — || October 10, 2012 || Haleakala || Pan-STARRS ||  || align=right | 3.5 km || 
|-id=333 bgcolor=#d6d6d6
| 578333 ||  || — || August 28, 2006 || Kitt Peak || Spacewatch ||  || align=right | 2.7 km || 
|-id=334 bgcolor=#d6d6d6
| 578334 ||  || — || April 18, 2009 || Mount Lemmon || Mount Lemmon Survey ||  || align=right | 2.9 km || 
|-id=335 bgcolor=#d6d6d6
| 578335 ||  || — || November 28, 2013 || Mount Lemmon || Mount Lemmon Survey ||  || align=right | 2.0 km || 
|-id=336 bgcolor=#d6d6d6
| 578336 ||  || — || January 4, 2014 || Haleakala || Pan-STARRS ||  || align=right | 2.7 km || 
|-id=337 bgcolor=#E9E9E9
| 578337 ||  || — || January 1, 2014 || Nogales || M. Schwartz, P. R. Holvorcem ||  || align=right | 2.2 km || 
|-id=338 bgcolor=#d6d6d6
| 578338 ||  || — || March 23, 2003 || Palomar || NEAT ||  || align=right | 3.4 km || 
|-id=339 bgcolor=#E9E9E9
| 578339 ||  || — || October 20, 2003 || Kitt Peak || Spacewatch ||  || align=right | 1.8 km || 
|-id=340 bgcolor=#d6d6d6
| 578340 ||  || — || January 10, 2014 || Kitt Peak || Spacewatch ||  || align=right | 1.7 km || 
|-id=341 bgcolor=#d6d6d6
| 578341 ||  || — || January 3, 2014 || Mount Lemmon || Mount Lemmon Survey ||  || align=right | 2.0 km || 
|-id=342 bgcolor=#d6d6d6
| 578342 ||  || — || January 9, 2014 || Haleakala || Pan-STARRS ||  || align=right | 3.1 km || 
|-id=343 bgcolor=#d6d6d6
| 578343 ||  || — || January 3, 2014 || Kitt Peak || Spacewatch ||  || align=right | 2.7 km || 
|-id=344 bgcolor=#d6d6d6
| 578344 ||  || — || December 22, 2008 || Kitt Peak || Spacewatch ||  || align=right | 1.8 km || 
|-id=345 bgcolor=#d6d6d6
| 578345 ||  || — || March 12, 2005 || Kitt Peak || M. W. Buie, L. H. Wasserman || KOR || align=right | 1.6 km || 
|-id=346 bgcolor=#d6d6d6
| 578346 ||  || — || December 27, 2013 || Kitt Peak || Spacewatch ||  || align=right | 2.9 km || 
|-id=347 bgcolor=#E9E9E9
| 578347 ||  || — || September 25, 2012 || Mount Lemmon || Mount Lemmon Survey ||  || align=right | 1.7 km || 
|-id=348 bgcolor=#d6d6d6
| 578348 ||  || — || January 20, 2009 || Kitt Peak || Spacewatch ||  || align=right | 1.8 km || 
|-id=349 bgcolor=#d6d6d6
| 578349 ||  || — || February 28, 2009 || Saint-Sulpice || B. Christophe ||  || align=right | 2.1 km || 
|-id=350 bgcolor=#d6d6d6
| 578350 ||  || — || December 30, 2013 || Mount Lemmon || Mount Lemmon Survey ||  || align=right | 2.5 km || 
|-id=351 bgcolor=#E9E9E9
| 578351 ||  || — || January 5, 2006 || Mount Lemmon || Mount Lemmon Survey ||  || align=right | 2.5 km || 
|-id=352 bgcolor=#E9E9E9
| 578352 ||  || — || December 21, 2004 || Catalina || CSS ||  || align=right | 2.0 km || 
|-id=353 bgcolor=#d6d6d6
| 578353 ||  || — || January 3, 2014 || Kitt Peak || Spacewatch ||  || align=right | 2.3 km || 
|-id=354 bgcolor=#E9E9E9
| 578354 ||  || — || October 7, 2008 || Mount Lemmon || Mount Lemmon Survey ||  || align=right | 1.5 km || 
|-id=355 bgcolor=#d6d6d6
| 578355 ||  || — || October 8, 2012 || Kitt Peak || Spacewatch ||  || align=right | 2.7 km || 
|-id=356 bgcolor=#d6d6d6
| 578356 ||  || — || November 21, 2001 || Apache Point || SDSS Collaboration ||  || align=right | 2.4 km || 
|-id=357 bgcolor=#E9E9E9
| 578357 ||  || — || December 30, 2013 || Mount Lemmon || Mount Lemmon Survey ||  || align=right | 1.9 km || 
|-id=358 bgcolor=#d6d6d6
| 578358 ||  || — || January 24, 2014 || Haleakala || Pan-STARRS ||  || align=right | 1.9 km || 
|-id=359 bgcolor=#fefefe
| 578359 ||  || — || September 16, 2003 || Kitt Peak || Spacewatch ||  || align=right data-sort-value="0.65" | 650 m || 
|-id=360 bgcolor=#d6d6d6
| 578360 ||  || — || September 14, 2006 || Kitt Peak || Spacewatch ||  || align=right | 3.0 km || 
|-id=361 bgcolor=#E9E9E9
| 578361 ||  || — || January 7, 2014 || Catalina || CSS ||  || align=right | 1.5 km || 
|-id=362 bgcolor=#d6d6d6
| 578362 ||  || — || January 7, 2014 || Mount Lemmon || Mount Lemmon Survey ||  || align=right | 2.8 km || 
|-id=363 bgcolor=#d6d6d6
| 578363 ||  || — || February 1, 2009 || Kitt Peak || Spacewatch ||  || align=right | 2.0 km || 
|-id=364 bgcolor=#E9E9E9
| 578364 ||  || — || January 16, 2005 || Kitt Peak || Spacewatch ||  || align=right | 1.1 km || 
|-id=365 bgcolor=#d6d6d6
| 578365 ||  || — || March 1, 2009 || Kitt Peak || Spacewatch ||  || align=right | 2.4 km || 
|-id=366 bgcolor=#d6d6d6
| 578366 ||  || — || May 13, 2009 || Kitt Peak || Spacewatch ||  || align=right | 2.3 km || 
|-id=367 bgcolor=#d6d6d6
| 578367 ||  || — || January 23, 2014 || Mount Lemmon || Mount Lemmon Survey ||  || align=right | 2.9 km || 
|-id=368 bgcolor=#C2FFFF
| 578368 ||  || — || January 23, 2014 || Mount Lemmon || Mount Lemmon Survey || L4 || align=right | 7.7 km || 
|-id=369 bgcolor=#E9E9E9
| 578369 ||  || — || March 10, 2005 || Mount Lemmon || Mount Lemmon Survey ||  || align=right | 1.8 km || 
|-id=370 bgcolor=#E9E9E9
| 578370 ||  || — || January 3, 2014 || Mayhill-ISON || L. Elenin ||  || align=right | 2.9 km || 
|-id=371 bgcolor=#d6d6d6
| 578371 ||  || — || March 10, 2005 || Mount Lemmon || Mount Lemmon Survey ||  || align=right | 2.4 km || 
|-id=372 bgcolor=#E9E9E9
| 578372 ||  || — || October 10, 2008 || Mount Lemmon || Mount Lemmon Survey ||  || align=right | 1.9 km || 
|-id=373 bgcolor=#fefefe
| 578373 ||  || — || December 25, 2013 || Kitt Peak || Spacewatch ||  || align=right data-sort-value="0.82" | 820 m || 
|-id=374 bgcolor=#d6d6d6
| 578374 ||  || — || January 24, 2014 || Haleakala || Pan-STARRS ||  || align=right | 3.1 km || 
|-id=375 bgcolor=#E9E9E9
| 578375 ||  || — || January 1, 2014 || Haleakala || Pan-STARRS ||  || align=right | 2.1 km || 
|-id=376 bgcolor=#d6d6d6
| 578376 ||  || — || January 24, 2014 || Haleakala || Pan-STARRS ||  || align=right | 2.9 km || 
|-id=377 bgcolor=#d6d6d6
| 578377 ||  || — || January 29, 2009 || Kitt Peak || Spacewatch ||  || align=right | 1.8 km || 
|-id=378 bgcolor=#E9E9E9
| 578378 ||  || — || November 30, 2008 || Kitt Peak || Spacewatch ||  || align=right | 1.7 km || 
|-id=379 bgcolor=#d6d6d6
| 578379 ||  || — || February 1, 2003 || Palomar || NEAT ||  || align=right | 3.5 km || 
|-id=380 bgcolor=#d6d6d6
| 578380 ||  || — || February 3, 2003 || Palomar || NEAT ||  || align=right | 2.8 km || 
|-id=381 bgcolor=#d6d6d6
| 578381 ||  || — || December 30, 2008 || Kitt Peak || Spacewatch ||  || align=right | 2.0 km || 
|-id=382 bgcolor=#E9E9E9
| 578382 ||  || — || January 28, 2014 || Kitt Peak || Spacewatch ||  || align=right | 1.4 km || 
|-id=383 bgcolor=#E9E9E9
| 578383 ||  || — || October 26, 2008 || Mount Lemmon || Mount Lemmon Survey ||  || align=right | 2.1 km || 
|-id=384 bgcolor=#fefefe
| 578384 ||  || — || January 28, 2014 || Mount Lemmon || Mount Lemmon Survey || H || align=right data-sort-value="0.52" | 520 m || 
|-id=385 bgcolor=#d6d6d6
| 578385 ||  || — || March 1, 2009 || Mount Lemmon || Mount Lemmon Survey ||  || align=right | 2.5 km || 
|-id=386 bgcolor=#d6d6d6
| 578386 ||  || — || January 1, 2014 || Mount Lemmon || Mount Lemmon Survey ||  || align=right | 2.5 km || 
|-id=387 bgcolor=#d6d6d6
| 578387 ||  || — || August 18, 2012 || ESA OGS || ESA OGS ||  || align=right | 3.1 km || 
|-id=388 bgcolor=#E9E9E9
| 578388 ||  || — || November 28, 2014 || Mount Lemmon || Mount Lemmon Survey ||  || align=right | 1.9 km || 
|-id=389 bgcolor=#d6d6d6
| 578389 ||  || — || January 25, 2014 || Haleakala || Pan-STARRS ||  || align=right | 2.5 km || 
|-id=390 bgcolor=#d6d6d6
| 578390 ||  || — || March 29, 2015 || Haleakala || Pan-STARRS ||  || align=right | 2.2 km || 
|-id=391 bgcolor=#E9E9E9
| 578391 ||  || — || January 21, 2014 || Mount Lemmon || Mount Lemmon Survey ||  || align=right | 1.3 km || 
|-id=392 bgcolor=#E9E9E9
| 578392 ||  || — || December 30, 2013 || Mount Lemmon || Mount Lemmon Survey ||  || align=right | 1.3 km || 
|-id=393 bgcolor=#d6d6d6
| 578393 ||  || — || January 28, 2014 || Mount Lemmon || Mount Lemmon Survey ||  || align=right | 2.3 km || 
|-id=394 bgcolor=#d6d6d6
| 578394 ||  || — || January 25, 2014 || Haleakala || Pan-STARRS ||  || align=right | 2.4 km || 
|-id=395 bgcolor=#d6d6d6
| 578395 ||  || — || July 5, 2016 || Haleakala || Pan-STARRS ||  || align=right | 1.7 km || 
|-id=396 bgcolor=#d6d6d6
| 578396 ||  || — || March 11, 2003 || Kitt Peak || Spacewatch ||  || align=right | 2.2 km || 
|-id=397 bgcolor=#d6d6d6
| 578397 ||  || — || January 23, 2014 || Mount Lemmon || Mount Lemmon Survey ||  || align=right | 2.7 km || 
|-id=398 bgcolor=#d6d6d6
| 578398 ||  || — || January 26, 2014 || Haleakala || Pan-STARRS ||  || align=right | 2.1 km || 
|-id=399 bgcolor=#d6d6d6
| 578399 ||  || — || January 31, 2014 || Haleakala || Pan-STARRS ||  || align=right | 2.8 km || 
|-id=400 bgcolor=#d6d6d6
| 578400 ||  || — || January 31, 2014 || Haleakala || Pan-STARRS ||  || align=right | 3.1 km || 
|}

578401–578500 

|-bgcolor=#d6d6d6
| 578401 ||  || — || January 29, 2014 || Kitt Peak || Spacewatch ||  || align=right | 2.7 km || 
|-id=402 bgcolor=#E9E9E9
| 578402 ||  || — || January 24, 2014 || Haleakala || Pan-STARRS ||  || align=right data-sort-value="0.82" | 820 m || 
|-id=403 bgcolor=#d6d6d6
| 578403 ||  || — || January 7, 2014 || Kitt Peak || Spacewatch ||  || align=right | 1.9 km || 
|-id=404 bgcolor=#d6d6d6
| 578404 ||  || — || January 23, 2014 || Kitt Peak || Spacewatch ||  || align=right | 2.2 km || 
|-id=405 bgcolor=#d6d6d6
| 578405 ||  || — || February 6, 2014 || Catalina || CSS ||  || align=right | 2.5 km || 
|-id=406 bgcolor=#fefefe
| 578406 ||  || — || November 24, 2009 || Kitt Peak || Spacewatch ||  || align=right data-sort-value="0.57" | 570 m || 
|-id=407 bgcolor=#E9E9E9
| 578407 ||  || — || January 2, 2014 || Kitt Peak || Spacewatch ||  || align=right data-sort-value="0.87" | 870 m || 
|-id=408 bgcolor=#E9E9E9
| 578408 ||  || — || December 11, 2013 || Mount Lemmon || Mount Lemmon Survey ||  || align=right | 2.6 km || 
|-id=409 bgcolor=#d6d6d6
| 578409 ||  || — || March 11, 2003 || Palomar || NEAT ||  || align=right | 3.4 km || 
|-id=410 bgcolor=#d6d6d6
| 578410 ||  || — || January 9, 2014 || Mount Lemmon || Mount Lemmon Survey ||  || align=right | 2.4 km || 
|-id=411 bgcolor=#C2FFFF
| 578411 ||  || — || September 19, 2009 || Kitt Peak || Spacewatch || L4 || align=right | 11 km || 
|-id=412 bgcolor=#d6d6d6
| 578412 ||  || — || November 28, 2013 || Mount Lemmon || Mount Lemmon Survey ||  || align=right | 3.2 km || 
|-id=413 bgcolor=#d6d6d6
| 578413 ||  || — || February 10, 2014 || Haleakala || Pan-STARRS ||  || align=right | 2.7 km || 
|-id=414 bgcolor=#E9E9E9
| 578414 ||  || — || February 3, 2009 || Mount Lemmon || Mount Lemmon Survey ||  || align=right | 2.4 km || 
|-id=415 bgcolor=#d6d6d6
| 578415 ||  || — || January 29, 2014 || Kitt Peak || Spacewatch ||  || align=right | 2.2 km || 
|-id=416 bgcolor=#E9E9E9
| 578416 ||  || — || July 11, 2016 || Haleakala || Pan-STARRS ||  || align=right | 1.2 km || 
|-id=417 bgcolor=#d6d6d6
| 578417 ||  || — || June 13, 2015 || Mount Lemmon || Mount Lemmon Survey ||  || align=right | 2.8 km || 
|-id=418 bgcolor=#d6d6d6
| 578418 ||  || — || February 9, 2014 || Haleakala || Pan-STARRS ||  || align=right | 2.7 km || 
|-id=419 bgcolor=#d6d6d6
| 578419 ||  || — || February 10, 2014 || Haleakala || Pan-STARRS ||  || align=right | 2.5 km || 
|-id=420 bgcolor=#d6d6d6
| 578420 ||  || — || February 11, 2014 || Mount Lemmon || Mount Lemmon Survey ||  || align=right | 2.5 km || 
|-id=421 bgcolor=#d6d6d6
| 578421 ||  || — || February 9, 2014 || Mount Lemmon || Mount Lemmon Survey ||  || align=right | 2.5 km || 
|-id=422 bgcolor=#d6d6d6
| 578422 ||  || — || February 5, 2014 || Mount Lemmon || Mount Lemmon Survey ||  || align=right | 2.1 km || 
|-id=423 bgcolor=#d6d6d6
| 578423 ||  || — || February 10, 2014 || Haleakala || Pan-STARRS ||  || align=right | 2.7 km || 
|-id=424 bgcolor=#d6d6d6
| 578424 ||  || — || February 8, 2014 || Mount Lemmon || Mount Lemmon Survey ||  || align=right | 2.0 km || 
|-id=425 bgcolor=#fefefe
| 578425 ||  || — || January 5, 2006 || Catalina || CSS || H || align=right data-sort-value="0.71" | 710 m || 
|-id=426 bgcolor=#fefefe
| 578426 ||  || — || January 29, 2014 || Kitt Peak || Spacewatch ||  || align=right data-sort-value="0.52" | 520 m || 
|-id=427 bgcolor=#d6d6d6
| 578427 ||  || — || August 8, 2005 || Cerro Tololo || Cerro Tololo Obs. ||  || align=right | 3.1 km || 
|-id=428 bgcolor=#d6d6d6
| 578428 ||  || — || July 28, 2005 || Palomar || NEAT || EOS || align=right | 2.7 km || 
|-id=429 bgcolor=#d6d6d6
| 578429 ||  || — || August 26, 2011 || Piszkesteto || K. Sárneczky ||  || align=right | 2.6 km || 
|-id=430 bgcolor=#d6d6d6
| 578430 ||  || — || October 10, 2007 || Mount Lemmon || Mount Lemmon Survey ||  || align=right | 2.2 km || 
|-id=431 bgcolor=#d6d6d6
| 578431 ||  || — || November 8, 2007 || Catalina || CSS ||  || align=right | 2.0 km || 
|-id=432 bgcolor=#d6d6d6
| 578432 ||  || — || February 9, 2003 || Palomar || NEAT ||  || align=right | 3.8 km || 
|-id=433 bgcolor=#d6d6d6
| 578433 ||  || — || August 27, 2006 || Kitt Peak || Spacewatch ||  || align=right | 3.0 km || 
|-id=434 bgcolor=#d6d6d6
| 578434 ||  || — || December 15, 2007 || Mount Lemmon || Mount Lemmon Survey ||  || align=right | 2.7 km || 
|-id=435 bgcolor=#d6d6d6
| 578435 ||  || — || December 6, 2012 || Mount Lemmon || Mount Lemmon Survey ||  || align=right | 3.5 km || 
|-id=436 bgcolor=#d6d6d6
| 578436 ||  || — || February 19, 2014 || Mount Lemmon || Mount Lemmon Survey ||  || align=right | 2.7 km || 
|-id=437 bgcolor=#d6d6d6
| 578437 ||  || — || February 19, 2014 || Mount Lemmon || Mount Lemmon Survey ||  || align=right | 3.1 km || 
|-id=438 bgcolor=#fefefe
| 578438 ||  || — || February 9, 2014 || Haleakala || Pan-STARRS ||  || align=right data-sort-value="0.62" | 620 m || 
|-id=439 bgcolor=#d6d6d6
| 578439 ||  || — || February 20, 2014 || Haleakala || Pan-STARRS ||  || align=right | 2.8 km || 
|-id=440 bgcolor=#d6d6d6
| 578440 ||  || — || October 21, 2007 || Mount Lemmon || Mount Lemmon Survey ||  || align=right | 3.2 km || 
|-id=441 bgcolor=#C2FFFF
| 578441 ||  || — || January 4, 2001 || Kitt Peak || Spacewatch || L4 || align=right | 9.5 km || 
|-id=442 bgcolor=#E9E9E9
| 578442 ||  || — || February 17, 2010 || Kitt Peak || Spacewatch ||  || align=right | 1.6 km || 
|-id=443 bgcolor=#d6d6d6
| 578443 ||  || — || September 21, 2001 || Apache Point || SDSS Collaboration ||  || align=right | 3.0 km || 
|-id=444 bgcolor=#d6d6d6
| 578444 ||  || — || February 20, 2014 || Mount Lemmon || Mount Lemmon Survey ||  || align=right | 2.7 km || 
|-id=445 bgcolor=#d6d6d6
| 578445 ||  || — || January 29, 2009 || Kitt Peak || Spacewatch ||  || align=right | 1.8 km || 
|-id=446 bgcolor=#E9E9E9
| 578446 ||  || — || September 27, 2003 || Kitt Peak || Spacewatch ||  || align=right | 1.4 km || 
|-id=447 bgcolor=#E9E9E9
| 578447 ||  || — || February 20, 2014 || Mount Lemmon || Mount Lemmon Survey ||  || align=right | 2.5 km || 
|-id=448 bgcolor=#d6d6d6
| 578448 ||  || — || February 20, 2014 || Mount Lemmon || Mount Lemmon Survey ||  || align=right | 2.3 km || 
|-id=449 bgcolor=#d6d6d6
| 578449 ||  || — || February 6, 2014 || Mount Lemmon || Mount Lemmon Survey ||  || align=right | 1.9 km || 
|-id=450 bgcolor=#d6d6d6
| 578450 ||  || — || January 10, 2014 || Mount Lemmon || Mount Lemmon Survey ||  || align=right | 2.3 km || 
|-id=451 bgcolor=#d6d6d6
| 578451 ||  || — || February 28, 2009 || Kitt Peak || Spacewatch ||  || align=right | 2.2 km || 
|-id=452 bgcolor=#d6d6d6
| 578452 ||  || — || February 9, 2003 || Palomar || NEAT || EOS || align=right | 2.4 km || 
|-id=453 bgcolor=#d6d6d6
| 578453 ||  || — || April 22, 2009 || Kitt Peak || Spacewatch ||  || align=right | 2.3 km || 
|-id=454 bgcolor=#d6d6d6
| 578454 ||  || — || March 17, 2009 || Bergisch Gladbach || W. Bickel ||  || align=right | 2.4 km || 
|-id=455 bgcolor=#E9E9E9
| 578455 ||  || — || February 1, 2014 || Wildberg || R. Apitzsch ||  || align=right | 1.2 km || 
|-id=456 bgcolor=#d6d6d6
| 578456 ||  || — || September 26, 2011 || Haleakala || Pan-STARRS ||  || align=right | 2.3 km || 
|-id=457 bgcolor=#d6d6d6
| 578457 ||  || — || March 11, 2003 || Palomar || NEAT ||  || align=right | 3.2 km || 
|-id=458 bgcolor=#d6d6d6
| 578458 ||  || — || November 12, 2001 || Apache Point || SDSS Collaboration ||  || align=right | 3.3 km || 
|-id=459 bgcolor=#d6d6d6
| 578459 ||  || — || September 26, 2006 || Kitt Peak || Spacewatch ||  || align=right | 2.8 km || 
|-id=460 bgcolor=#d6d6d6
| 578460 ||  || — || January 23, 2014 || Mount Lemmon || Mount Lemmon Survey ||  || align=right | 2.5 km || 
|-id=461 bgcolor=#d6d6d6
| 578461 ||  || — || February 14, 2004 || Kitt Peak || Spacewatch ||  || align=right | 3.4 km || 
|-id=462 bgcolor=#fefefe
| 578462 ||  || — || January 25, 2009 || Kitt Peak || Spacewatch || H || align=right data-sort-value="0.57" | 570 m || 
|-id=463 bgcolor=#d6d6d6
| 578463 ||  || — || February 26, 2009 || Kitt Peak || Spacewatch ||  || align=right | 1.9 km || 
|-id=464 bgcolor=#E9E9E9
| 578464 ||  || — || February 24, 2014 || Haleakala || Pan-STARRS ||  || align=right | 1.4 km || 
|-id=465 bgcolor=#fefefe
| 578465 ||  || — || October 9, 2012 || Mount Lemmon || Mount Lemmon Survey ||  || align=right data-sort-value="0.68" | 680 m || 
|-id=466 bgcolor=#fefefe
| 578466 ||  || — || February 27, 2014 || Kitt Peak || Spacewatch ||  || align=right data-sort-value="0.57" | 570 m || 
|-id=467 bgcolor=#d6d6d6
| 578467 ||  || — || July 30, 2005 || Palomar || NEAT ||  || align=right | 2.8 km || 
|-id=468 bgcolor=#d6d6d6
| 578468 ||  || — || February 26, 2014 || Haleakala || Pan-STARRS ||  || align=right | 2.4 km || 
|-id=469 bgcolor=#d6d6d6
| 578469 ||  || — || October 5, 2000 || Kitt Peak || Spacewatch ||  || align=right | 3.2 km || 
|-id=470 bgcolor=#d6d6d6
| 578470 ||  || — || February 10, 2014 || Haleakala || Pan-STARRS ||  || align=right | 2.4 km || 
|-id=471 bgcolor=#d6d6d6
| 578471 ||  || — || February 26, 2014 || Haleakala || Pan-STARRS ||  || align=right | 2.5 km || 
|-id=472 bgcolor=#d6d6d6
| 578472 ||  || — || August 19, 2001 || Cerro Tololo || Cerro Tololo Obs. || EOS || align=right | 1.9 km || 
|-id=473 bgcolor=#d6d6d6
| 578473 ||  || — || January 13, 2008 || Mount Lemmon || Mount Lemmon Survey ||  || align=right | 2.4 km || 
|-id=474 bgcolor=#d6d6d6
| 578474 ||  || — || March 26, 2003 || Palomar || NEAT ||  || align=right | 3.9 km || 
|-id=475 bgcolor=#d6d6d6
| 578475 ||  || — || October 3, 2006 || Kitt Peak || Spacewatch ||  || align=right | 2.2 km || 
|-id=476 bgcolor=#d6d6d6
| 578476 ||  || — || December 9, 2012 || Haleakala || Pan-STARRS ||  || align=right | 2.2 km || 
|-id=477 bgcolor=#d6d6d6
| 578477 ||  || — || December 30, 2007 || Kitt Peak || Spacewatch ||  || align=right | 2.0 km || 
|-id=478 bgcolor=#E9E9E9
| 578478 ||  || — || February 26, 2014 || Haleakala || Pan-STARRS ||  || align=right | 1.8 km || 
|-id=479 bgcolor=#d6d6d6
| 578479 ||  || — || January 7, 2002 || Kitt Peak || Spacewatch ||  || align=right | 3.6 km || 
|-id=480 bgcolor=#d6d6d6
| 578480 ||  || — || February 9, 2002 || Kitt Peak || Spacewatch ||  || align=right | 3.4 km || 
|-id=481 bgcolor=#d6d6d6
| 578481 ||  || — || August 30, 2005 || Kitt Peak || Spacewatch ||  || align=right | 2.7 km || 
|-id=482 bgcolor=#d6d6d6
| 578482 ||  || — || February 26, 2014 || Haleakala || Pan-STARRS ||  || align=right | 1.7 km || 
|-id=483 bgcolor=#d6d6d6
| 578483 ||  || — || February 26, 2014 || Haleakala || Pan-STARRS ||  || align=right | 2.4 km || 
|-id=484 bgcolor=#d6d6d6
| 578484 ||  || — || February 26, 2014 || Haleakala || Pan-STARRS ||  || align=right | 2.8 km || 
|-id=485 bgcolor=#d6d6d6
| 578485 ||  || — || February 26, 2014 || Haleakala || Pan-STARRS ||  || align=right | 2.2 km || 
|-id=486 bgcolor=#d6d6d6
| 578486 ||  || — || March 18, 2009 || Kitt Peak || Spacewatch ||  || align=right | 2.9 km || 
|-id=487 bgcolor=#fefefe
| 578487 ||  || — || February 16, 2004 || Kitt Peak || Spacewatch ||  || align=right data-sort-value="0.71" | 710 m || 
|-id=488 bgcolor=#d6d6d6
| 578488 ||  || — || February 26, 2014 || Haleakala || Pan-STARRS ||  || align=right | 2.0 km || 
|-id=489 bgcolor=#d6d6d6
| 578489 ||  || — || February 26, 2014 || Haleakala || Pan-STARRS ||  || align=right | 2.1 km || 
|-id=490 bgcolor=#d6d6d6
| 578490 ||  || — || March 26, 2009 || Kitt Peak || Spacewatch ||  || align=right | 2.5 km || 
|-id=491 bgcolor=#d6d6d6
| 578491 ||  || — || September 28, 2011 || Kitt Peak || Spacewatch ||  || align=right | 2.8 km || 
|-id=492 bgcolor=#d6d6d6
| 578492 ||  || — || April 28, 2009 || Mount Lemmon || Mount Lemmon Survey ||  || align=right | 2.1 km || 
|-id=493 bgcolor=#d6d6d6
| 578493 ||  || — || August 6, 2005 || Palomar || NEAT ||  || align=right | 3.3 km || 
|-id=494 bgcolor=#d6d6d6
| 578494 ||  || — || January 21, 2002 || Kitt Peak || Spacewatch ||  || align=right | 3.2 km || 
|-id=495 bgcolor=#d6d6d6
| 578495 ||  || — || January 30, 2008 || Mount Lemmon || Mount Lemmon Survey ||  || align=right | 2.7 km || 
|-id=496 bgcolor=#d6d6d6
| 578496 ||  || — || February 26, 2014 || Haleakala || Pan-STARRS ||  || align=right | 2.2 km || 
|-id=497 bgcolor=#d6d6d6
| 578497 ||  || — || February 26, 2014 || Haleakala || Pan-STARRS ||  || align=right | 2.5 km || 
|-id=498 bgcolor=#d6d6d6
| 578498 ||  || — || March 16, 2009 || Kitt Peak || Spacewatch ||  || align=right | 2.1 km || 
|-id=499 bgcolor=#d6d6d6
| 578499 ||  || — || August 21, 2004 || Kitt Peak || Spacewatch ||  || align=right | 2.3 km || 
|-id=500 bgcolor=#d6d6d6
| 578500 ||  || — || February 26, 2014 || Haleakala || Pan-STARRS ||  || align=right | 2.1 km || 
|}

578501–578600 

|-bgcolor=#E9E9E9
| 578501 ||  || — || September 22, 2003 || Kitt Peak || Spacewatch ||  || align=right | 1.1 km || 
|-id=502 bgcolor=#d6d6d6
| 578502 ||  || — || September 18, 2011 || Mount Lemmon || Mount Lemmon Survey ||  || align=right | 2.4 km || 
|-id=503 bgcolor=#d6d6d6
| 578503 ||  || — || August 27, 2011 || Haleakala || Pan-STARRS ||  || align=right | 2.5 km || 
|-id=504 bgcolor=#d6d6d6
| 578504 ||  || — || February 25, 2014 || Kitt Peak || Spacewatch ||  || align=right | 2.3 km || 
|-id=505 bgcolor=#d6d6d6
| 578505 ||  || — || February 26, 2014 || Mount Lemmon || Mount Lemmon Survey ||  || align=right | 2.4 km || 
|-id=506 bgcolor=#d6d6d6
| 578506 ||  || — || September 12, 2007 || Mount Lemmon || Mount Lemmon Survey ||  || align=right | 1.9 km || 
|-id=507 bgcolor=#d6d6d6
| 578507 ||  || — || September 23, 2011 || Kitt Peak || Spacewatch ||  || align=right | 2.6 km || 
|-id=508 bgcolor=#d6d6d6
| 578508 ||  || — || February 26, 2014 || Mount Lemmon || Mount Lemmon Survey ||  || align=right | 2.0 km || 
|-id=509 bgcolor=#d6d6d6
| 578509 ||  || — || March 11, 2003 || Palomar || NEAT || TIR || align=right | 3.6 km || 
|-id=510 bgcolor=#fefefe
| 578510 ||  || — || February 26, 2014 || Haleakala || Pan-STARRS ||  || align=right data-sort-value="0.65" | 650 m || 
|-id=511 bgcolor=#d6d6d6
| 578511 ||  || — || February 26, 2014 || Haleakala || Pan-STARRS ||  || align=right | 2.3 km || 
|-id=512 bgcolor=#d6d6d6
| 578512 ||  || — || February 26, 2014 || Haleakala || Pan-STARRS ||  || align=right | 2.3 km || 
|-id=513 bgcolor=#d6d6d6
| 578513 ||  || — || October 20, 2007 || Mount Lemmon || Mount Lemmon Survey ||  || align=right | 1.9 km || 
|-id=514 bgcolor=#E9E9E9
| 578514 ||  || — || January 25, 2014 || Haleakala || Pan-STARRS ||  || align=right data-sort-value="0.77" | 770 m || 
|-id=515 bgcolor=#d6d6d6
| 578515 ||  || — || February 27, 2014 || Mount Lemmon || Mount Lemmon Survey ||  || align=right | 2.7 km || 
|-id=516 bgcolor=#d6d6d6
| 578516 ||  || — || October 14, 2001 || Cima Ekar || C. Barbieri, G. Pignata ||  || align=right | 3.4 km || 
|-id=517 bgcolor=#d6d6d6
| 578517 ||  || — || September 4, 2011 || Haleakala || Pan-STARRS ||  || align=right | 2.2 km || 
|-id=518 bgcolor=#d6d6d6
| 578518 ||  || — || February 27, 2014 || Mount Lemmon || Mount Lemmon Survey ||  || align=right | 2.3 km || 
|-id=519 bgcolor=#d6d6d6
| 578519 ||  || — || February 27, 2014 || Mount Lemmon || Mount Lemmon Survey ||  || align=right | 2.7 km || 
|-id=520 bgcolor=#d6d6d6
| 578520 ||  || — || September 2, 2011 || Charleston || R. Holmes ||  || align=right | 3.1 km || 
|-id=521 bgcolor=#E9E9E9
| 578521 ||  || — || January 16, 2005 || Mauna Kea || Mauna Kea Obs. ||  || align=right | 1.2 km || 
|-id=522 bgcolor=#E9E9E9
| 578522 ||  || — || September 20, 2011 || Haleakala || Pan-STARRS ||  || align=right | 1.3 km || 
|-id=523 bgcolor=#d6d6d6
| 578523 ||  || — || March 8, 2003 || Socorro || LINEAR ||  || align=right | 3.2 km || 
|-id=524 bgcolor=#d6d6d6
| 578524 ||  || — || December 5, 2002 || Socorro || LINEAR ||  || align=right | 2.8 km || 
|-id=525 bgcolor=#d6d6d6
| 578525 ||  || — || February 27, 2014 || Haleakala || Pan-STARRS ||  || align=right | 2.4 km || 
|-id=526 bgcolor=#d6d6d6
| 578526 ||  || — || March 30, 2003 || Kitt Peak || Spacewatch || THB || align=right | 2.8 km || 
|-id=527 bgcolor=#d6d6d6
| 578527 ||  || — || July 7, 2005 || Mauna Kea || Mauna Kea Obs. ||  || align=right | 2.3 km || 
|-id=528 bgcolor=#d6d6d6
| 578528 ||  || — || February 9, 2014 || Haleakala || Pan-STARRS ||  || align=right | 2.0 km || 
|-id=529 bgcolor=#d6d6d6
| 578529 ||  || — || September 4, 2011 || Haleakala || Pan-STARRS ||  || align=right | 2.0 km || 
|-id=530 bgcolor=#d6d6d6
| 578530 ||  || — || November 15, 2006 || Kitt Peak || Spacewatch ||  || align=right | 2.2 km || 
|-id=531 bgcolor=#E9E9E9
| 578531 ||  || — || February 28, 2014 || Haleakala || Pan-STARRS ||  || align=right | 1.5 km || 
|-id=532 bgcolor=#d6d6d6
| 578532 ||  || — || February 25, 2014 || Kitt Peak || Spacewatch ||  || align=right | 2.2 km || 
|-id=533 bgcolor=#d6d6d6
| 578533 ||  || — || March 7, 2003 || St. Veran || Saint-Véran Obs. || THM || align=right | 2.2 km || 
|-id=534 bgcolor=#fefefe
| 578534 ||  || — || April 30, 2011 || Mount Lemmon || Mount Lemmon Survey ||  || align=right data-sort-value="0.49" | 490 m || 
|-id=535 bgcolor=#E9E9E9
| 578535 ||  || — || May 30, 2006 || Kitt Peak || Spacewatch ||  || align=right | 1.5 km || 
|-id=536 bgcolor=#d6d6d6
| 578536 ||  || — || April 28, 2009 || Kitt Peak || Spacewatch ||  || align=right | 2.8 km || 
|-id=537 bgcolor=#d6d6d6
| 578537 ||  || — || December 5, 2007 || Kitt Peak || Spacewatch ||  || align=right | 2.4 km || 
|-id=538 bgcolor=#d6d6d6
| 578538 ||  || — || September 26, 2011 || Haleakala || Pan-STARRS ||  || align=right | 2.2 km || 
|-id=539 bgcolor=#E9E9E9
| 578539 ||  || — || October 11, 2012 || Piszkesteto || K. Sárneczky ||  || align=right data-sort-value="0.98" | 980 m || 
|-id=540 bgcolor=#d6d6d6
| 578540 ||  || — || February 22, 2014 || Kitt Peak || Spacewatch ||  || align=right | 2.6 km || 
|-id=541 bgcolor=#d6d6d6
| 578541 ||  || — || April 5, 2003 || Kitt Peak || Spacewatch ||  || align=right | 3.0 km || 
|-id=542 bgcolor=#d6d6d6
| 578542 ||  || — || November 3, 2007 || Kitt Peak || Spacewatch ||  || align=right | 2.0 km || 
|-id=543 bgcolor=#d6d6d6
| 578543 ||  || — || February 28, 2014 || Haleakala || Pan-STARRS ||  || align=right | 2.1 km || 
|-id=544 bgcolor=#d6d6d6
| 578544 ||  || — || February 28, 2014 || Haleakala || Pan-STARRS ||  || align=right | 2.4 km || 
|-id=545 bgcolor=#d6d6d6
| 578545 ||  || — || February 28, 2014 || Haleakala || Pan-STARRS ||  || align=right | 1.5 km || 
|-id=546 bgcolor=#d6d6d6
| 578546 ||  || — || August 26, 2000 || Cerro Tololo || R. Millis, L. H. Wasserman ||  || align=right | 2.0 km || 
|-id=547 bgcolor=#d6d6d6
| 578547 ||  || — || August 28, 2006 || Kitt Peak || Spacewatch ||  || align=right | 2.6 km || 
|-id=548 bgcolor=#d6d6d6
| 578548 ||  || — || March 24, 2003 || Kitt Peak || Spacewatch ||  || align=right | 2.9 km || 
|-id=549 bgcolor=#d6d6d6
| 578549 ||  || — || February 22, 2014 || Kitt Peak || Spacewatch ||  || align=right | 2.4 km || 
|-id=550 bgcolor=#d6d6d6
| 578550 ||  || — || January 10, 2008 || Mount Lemmon || Mount Lemmon Survey ||  || align=right | 3.2 km || 
|-id=551 bgcolor=#d6d6d6
| 578551 ||  || — || February 28, 2014 || Haleakala || Pan-STARRS ||  || align=right | 2.3 km || 
|-id=552 bgcolor=#d6d6d6
| 578552 ||  || — || February 28, 2014 || Haleakala || Pan-STARRS ||  || align=right | 2.4 km || 
|-id=553 bgcolor=#d6d6d6
| 578553 ||  || — || February 25, 2014 || Kitt Peak || Spacewatch ||  || align=right | 2.5 km || 
|-id=554 bgcolor=#d6d6d6
| 578554 ||  || — || November 8, 2007 || Kitt Peak || Spacewatch ||  || align=right | 2.5 km || 
|-id=555 bgcolor=#d6d6d6
| 578555 ||  || — || August 28, 2006 || Kitt Peak || Spacewatch ||  || align=right | 2.8 km || 
|-id=556 bgcolor=#d6d6d6
| 578556 ||  || — || June 15, 2010 || Mount Lemmon || Mount Lemmon Survey ||  || align=right | 2.4 km || 
|-id=557 bgcolor=#d6d6d6
| 578557 ||  || — || March 10, 2003 || Kitt Peak || Spacewatch ||  || align=right | 2.3 km || 
|-id=558 bgcolor=#d6d6d6
| 578558 ||  || — || February 21, 2003 || Palomar || NEAT || EOS || align=right | 2.5 km || 
|-id=559 bgcolor=#C7FF8F
| 578559 ||  || — || January 22, 2012 || Haleakala || Pan-STARRS || centaur || align=right | 38 km || 
|-id=560 bgcolor=#d6d6d6
| 578560 ||  || — || February 7, 2008 || Mount Lemmon || Mount Lemmon Survey ||  || align=right | 2.5 km || 
|-id=561 bgcolor=#d6d6d6
| 578561 ||  || — || February 20, 2014 || Mount Lemmon || Mount Lemmon Survey ||  || align=right | 2.5 km || 
|-id=562 bgcolor=#d6d6d6
| 578562 ||  || — || March 23, 2003 || Apache Point || SDSS Collaboration ||  || align=right | 2.8 km || 
|-id=563 bgcolor=#d6d6d6
| 578563 ||  || — || May 1, 2009 || Mount Lemmon || Mount Lemmon Survey ||  || align=right | 2.6 km || 
|-id=564 bgcolor=#d6d6d6
| 578564 ||  || — || February 26, 2014 || Haleakala || Pan-STARRS ||  || align=right | 1.9 km || 
|-id=565 bgcolor=#E9E9E9
| 578565 ||  || — || September 24, 2008 || Mount Lemmon || Mount Lemmon Survey ||  || align=right | 1.3 km || 
|-id=566 bgcolor=#fefefe
| 578566 ||  || — || February 26, 2014 || Haleakala || Pan-STARRS ||  || align=right data-sort-value="0.82" | 820 m || 
|-id=567 bgcolor=#d6d6d6
| 578567 ||  || — || March 8, 2003 || Kitt Peak || Spacewatch ||  || align=right | 2.2 km || 
|-id=568 bgcolor=#E9E9E9
| 578568 ||  || — || April 4, 2005 || Mount Lemmon || Mount Lemmon Survey ||  || align=right | 1.7 km || 
|-id=569 bgcolor=#d6d6d6
| 578569 ||  || — || February 27, 2014 || Haleakala || Pan-STARRS ||  || align=right | 2.1 km || 
|-id=570 bgcolor=#d6d6d6
| 578570 ||  || — || February 24, 2014 || Haleakala || Pan-STARRS ||  || align=right | 2.0 km || 
|-id=571 bgcolor=#E9E9E9
| 578571 ||  || — || February 28, 2014 || Haleakala || Pan-STARRS ||  || align=right | 1.1 km || 
|-id=572 bgcolor=#d6d6d6
| 578572 ||  || — || February 20, 2014 || Mount Lemmon || Mount Lemmon Survey ||  || align=right | 2.7 km || 
|-id=573 bgcolor=#E9E9E9
| 578573 ||  || — || February 24, 2014 || Haleakala || Pan-STARRS ||  || align=right | 1.2 km || 
|-id=574 bgcolor=#d6d6d6
| 578574 ||  || — || March 8, 2008 || Mount Lemmon || Mount Lemmon Survey ||  || align=right | 1.9 km || 
|-id=575 bgcolor=#d6d6d6
| 578575 ||  || — || February 24, 2014 || Haleakala || Pan-STARRS ||  || align=right | 2.8 km || 
|-id=576 bgcolor=#E9E9E9
| 578576 ||  || — || September 27, 2016 || Haleakala || Pan-STARRS ||  || align=right data-sort-value="0.76" | 760 m || 
|-id=577 bgcolor=#d6d6d6
| 578577 ||  || — || May 21, 2015 || Haleakala || Pan-STARRS ||  || align=right | 2.1 km || 
|-id=578 bgcolor=#d6d6d6
| 578578 ||  || — || May 22, 2015 || Haleakala || Pan-STARRS ||  || align=right | 2.0 km || 
|-id=579 bgcolor=#d6d6d6
| 578579 ||  || — || February 28, 2014 || Mount Lemmon || Mount Lemmon Survey ||  || align=right | 2.0 km || 
|-id=580 bgcolor=#d6d6d6
| 578580 ||  || — || February 26, 2014 || Mount Lemmon || Mount Lemmon Survey ||  || align=right | 2.1 km || 
|-id=581 bgcolor=#d6d6d6
| 578581 ||  || — || February 27, 2014 || Mount Lemmon || Mount Lemmon Survey ||  || align=right | 2.6 km || 
|-id=582 bgcolor=#d6d6d6
| 578582 ||  || — || February 19, 2014 || Kitt Peak || Spacewatch ||  || align=right | 2.5 km || 
|-id=583 bgcolor=#d6d6d6
| 578583 ||  || — || February 24, 2014 || Haleakala || Pan-STARRS ||  || align=right | 2.5 km || 
|-id=584 bgcolor=#d6d6d6
| 578584 ||  || — || February 26, 2014 || Mount Lemmon || Mount Lemmon Survey ||  || align=right | 2.2 km || 
|-id=585 bgcolor=#d6d6d6
| 578585 ||  || — || February 28, 2014 || Haleakala || Pan-STARRS ||  || align=right | 2.1 km || 
|-id=586 bgcolor=#d6d6d6
| 578586 ||  || — || February 26, 2014 || Mount Lemmon || Mount Lemmon Survey ||  || align=right | 1.9 km || 
|-id=587 bgcolor=#d6d6d6
| 578587 ||  || — || February 28, 2014 || Haleakala || Pan-STARRS ||  || align=right | 1.6 km || 
|-id=588 bgcolor=#d6d6d6
| 578588 ||  || — || February 22, 2014 || Kitt Peak || Spacewatch ||  || align=right | 2.3 km || 
|-id=589 bgcolor=#d6d6d6
| 578589 ||  || — || May 9, 2004 || Kitt Peak || Spacewatch ||  || align=right | 2.2 km || 
|-id=590 bgcolor=#d6d6d6
| 578590 ||  || — || February 26, 2014 || Haleakala || Pan-STARRS ||  || align=right | 2.6 km || 
|-id=591 bgcolor=#d6d6d6
| 578591 ||  || — || February 26, 2014 || Mount Lemmon || Mount Lemmon Survey ||  || align=right | 2.8 km || 
|-id=592 bgcolor=#d6d6d6
| 578592 ||  || — || February 26, 2014 || Haleakala || Pan-STARRS ||  || align=right | 2.2 km || 
|-id=593 bgcolor=#d6d6d6
| 578593 ||  || — || February 26, 2014 || Haleakala || Pan-STARRS ||  || align=right | 1.9 km || 
|-id=594 bgcolor=#d6d6d6
| 578594 ||  || — || February 27, 2014 || Haleakala || Pan-STARRS ||  || align=right | 2.2 km || 
|-id=595 bgcolor=#d6d6d6
| 578595 ||  || — || February 28, 2014 || Haleakala || Pan-STARRS ||  || align=right | 2.4 km || 
|-id=596 bgcolor=#d6d6d6
| 578596 ||  || — || February 27, 2014 || Haleakala || Pan-STARRS ||  || align=right | 2.0 km || 
|-id=597 bgcolor=#d6d6d6
| 578597 ||  || — || February 24, 2014 || Haleakala || Pan-STARRS ||  || align=right | 2.2 km || 
|-id=598 bgcolor=#d6d6d6
| 578598 ||  || — || September 18, 1999 || Kitt Peak || Spacewatch ||  || align=right | 3.4 km || 
|-id=599 bgcolor=#d6d6d6
| 578599 ||  || — || February 27, 2014 || Haleakala || Pan-STARRS ||  || align=right | 2.3 km || 
|-id=600 bgcolor=#d6d6d6
| 578600 ||  || — || February 28, 2014 || Haleakala || Pan-STARRS ||  || align=right | 2.0 km || 
|}

578601–578700 

|-bgcolor=#E9E9E9
| 578601 ||  || — || February 26, 2014 || Haleakala || Pan-STARRS ||  || align=right data-sort-value="0.94" | 940 m || 
|-id=602 bgcolor=#d6d6d6
| 578602 ||  || — || February 26, 2014 || Haleakala || Pan-STARRS ||  || align=right | 2.4 km || 
|-id=603 bgcolor=#d6d6d6
| 578603 ||  || — || February 26, 2014 || Mount Lemmon || Mount Lemmon Survey ||  || align=right | 2.4 km || 
|-id=604 bgcolor=#d6d6d6
| 578604 ||  || — || February 27, 2014 || Mount Lemmon || Mount Lemmon Survey ||  || align=right | 2.3 km || 
|-id=605 bgcolor=#fefefe
| 578605 ||  || — || February 28, 2014 || Haleakala || Pan-STARRS ||  || align=right data-sort-value="0.62" | 620 m || 
|-id=606 bgcolor=#fefefe
| 578606 ||  || — || February 28, 2014 || Mount Lemmon || Mount Lemmon Survey ||  || align=right data-sort-value="0.64" | 640 m || 
|-id=607 bgcolor=#fefefe
| 578607 ||  || — || April 13, 2004 || Kitt Peak || Spacewatch ||  || align=right data-sort-value="0.58" | 580 m || 
|-id=608 bgcolor=#d6d6d6
| 578608 ||  || — || February 10, 2008 || Kitt Peak || Spacewatch || Tj (2.99) || align=right | 2.7 km || 
|-id=609 bgcolor=#d6d6d6
| 578609 ||  || — || August 27, 2011 || Haleakala || Pan-STARRS ||  || align=right | 2.3 km || 
|-id=610 bgcolor=#d6d6d6
| 578610 ||  || — || March 13, 2003 || Kitt Peak || Spacewatch ||  || align=right | 2.5 km || 
|-id=611 bgcolor=#d6d6d6
| 578611 ||  || — || October 21, 2006 || Kitt Peak || Spacewatch ||  || align=right | 2.5 km || 
|-id=612 bgcolor=#d6d6d6
| 578612 ||  || — || September 8, 2000 || Kitt Peak || Spacewatch ||  || align=right | 2.8 km || 
|-id=613 bgcolor=#d6d6d6
| 578613 ||  || — || June 22, 2009 || Bergisch Gladbach || W. Bickel ||  || align=right | 2.3 km || 
|-id=614 bgcolor=#fefefe
| 578614 ||  || — || March 13, 2011 || Kitt Peak || Spacewatch ||  || align=right data-sort-value="0.59" | 590 m || 
|-id=615 bgcolor=#E9E9E9
| 578615 ||  || — || May 22, 2001 || Kitt Peak || Spacewatch ||  || align=right | 2.1 km || 
|-id=616 bgcolor=#d6d6d6
| 578616 ||  || — || March 6, 2014 || Mount Lemmon || Mount Lemmon Survey ||  || align=right | 1.8 km || 
|-id=617 bgcolor=#d6d6d6
| 578617 ||  || — || March 7, 2014 || Mount Lemmon || Mount Lemmon Survey ||  || align=right | 2.6 km || 
|-id=618 bgcolor=#d6d6d6
| 578618 ||  || — || March 18, 2009 || Catalina || CSS ||  || align=right | 4.0 km || 
|-id=619 bgcolor=#d6d6d6
| 578619 ||  || — || March 8, 2003 || Kitt Peak || Spacewatch ||  || align=right | 2.4 km || 
|-id=620 bgcolor=#d6d6d6
| 578620 ||  || — || February 27, 2014 || Mount Lemmon || Mount Lemmon Survey ||  || align=right | 2.8 km || 
|-id=621 bgcolor=#d6d6d6
| 578621 ||  || — || March 7, 2014 || Mount Lemmon || Mount Lemmon Survey ||  || align=right | 2.2 km || 
|-id=622 bgcolor=#d6d6d6
| 578622 ||  || — || October 21, 2012 || Piszkesteto || G. Hodosán ||  || align=right | 3.1 km || 
|-id=623 bgcolor=#d6d6d6
| 578623 ||  || — || November 8, 2013 || Mount Lemmon || Mount Lemmon Survey ||  || align=right | 2.8 km || 
|-id=624 bgcolor=#d6d6d6
| 578624 ||  || — || September 30, 2006 || Mount Lemmon || Mount Lemmon Survey ||  || align=right | 2.3 km || 
|-id=625 bgcolor=#fefefe
| 578625 ||  || — || December 13, 2006 || Mount Lemmon || Mount Lemmon Survey ||  || align=right data-sort-value="0.44" | 440 m || 
|-id=626 bgcolor=#d6d6d6
| 578626 ||  || — || July 29, 2000 || Cerro Tololo || M. W. Buie, S. D. Kern ||  || align=right | 3.3 km || 
|-id=627 bgcolor=#d6d6d6
| 578627 ||  || — || December 19, 2007 || Mount Lemmon || Mount Lemmon Survey ||  || align=right | 3.2 km || 
|-id=628 bgcolor=#E9E9E9
| 578628 ||  || — || March 8, 2014 || Kitt Peak || Spacewatch ||  || align=right | 1.5 km || 
|-id=629 bgcolor=#d6d6d6
| 578629 ||  || — || April 10, 2004 || Palomar || NEAT ||  || align=right | 3.8 km || 
|-id=630 bgcolor=#d6d6d6
| 578630 ||  || — || February 28, 2014 || Haleakala || Pan-STARRS ||  || align=right | 2.3 km || 
|-id=631 bgcolor=#d6d6d6
| 578631 ||  || — || March 5, 2014 || Haleakala || Pan-STARRS ||  || align=right | 2.4 km || 
|-id=632 bgcolor=#fefefe
| 578632 ||  || — || October 14, 2012 || Kitt Peak || Spacewatch ||  || align=right data-sort-value="0.60" | 600 m || 
|-id=633 bgcolor=#d6d6d6
| 578633 ||  || — || March 11, 2008 || Mount Lemmon || Mount Lemmon Survey || 7:4 || align=right | 2.9 km || 
|-id=634 bgcolor=#d6d6d6
| 578634 ||  || — || November 25, 2002 || Palomar || NEAT ||  || align=right | 3.3 km || 
|-id=635 bgcolor=#d6d6d6
| 578635 ||  || — || January 14, 2008 || Kitt Peak || Spacewatch ||  || align=right | 2.6 km || 
|-id=636 bgcolor=#C2FFFF
| 578636 ||  || — || September 17, 2009 || Mount Lemmon || Mount Lemmon Survey || L4 || align=right | 8.5 km || 
|-id=637 bgcolor=#d6d6d6
| 578637 ||  || — || March 8, 2014 || Mount Lemmon || Mount Lemmon Survey ||  || align=right | 3.5 km || 
|-id=638 bgcolor=#d6d6d6
| 578638 ||  || — || April 13, 2004 || Kitt Peak || Spacewatch ||  || align=right | 3.2 km || 
|-id=639 bgcolor=#fefefe
| 578639 ||  || — || April 5, 2011 || Mount Lemmon || Mount Lemmon Survey ||  || align=right data-sort-value="0.61" | 610 m || 
|-id=640 bgcolor=#d6d6d6
| 578640 ||  || — || December 17, 2007 || Kitt Peak || Spacewatch ||  || align=right | 2.4 km || 
|-id=641 bgcolor=#d6d6d6
| 578641 ||  || — || March 8, 2014 || Mount Lemmon || Mount Lemmon Survey ||  || align=right | 2.5 km || 
|-id=642 bgcolor=#d6d6d6
| 578642 ||  || — || March 8, 2014 || Mount Lemmon || Mount Lemmon Survey ||  || align=right | 2.8 km || 
|-id=643 bgcolor=#d6d6d6
| 578643 ||  || — || March 30, 2004 || Kitt Peak || Spacewatch ||  || align=right | 2.4 km || 
|-id=644 bgcolor=#d6d6d6
| 578644 ||  || — || March 8, 2014 || Mount Lemmon || Mount Lemmon Survey ||  || align=right | 2.4 km || 
|-id=645 bgcolor=#d6d6d6
| 578645 ||  || — || September 24, 2011 || Haleakala || Pan-STARRS ||  || align=right | 2.5 km || 
|-id=646 bgcolor=#E9E9E9
| 578646 ||  || — || March 11, 2014 || Kitt Peak || Spacewatch ||  || align=right | 1.1 km || 
|-id=647 bgcolor=#d6d6d6
| 578647 ||  || — || April 9, 2003 || Kitt Peak || Spacewatch ||  || align=right | 2.3 km || 
|-id=648 bgcolor=#d6d6d6
| 578648 ||  || — || March 11, 2014 || Mount Lemmon || Mount Lemmon Survey ||  || align=right | 2.7 km || 
|-id=649 bgcolor=#d6d6d6
| 578649 ||  || — || March 31, 2003 || Apache Point || SDSS Collaboration ||  || align=right | 2.7 km || 
|-id=650 bgcolor=#d6d6d6
| 578650 ||  || — || October 16, 2001 || Cima Ekar || C. Barbieri, G. Pignata ||  || align=right | 3.7 km || 
|-id=651 bgcolor=#d6d6d6
| 578651 ||  || — || February 28, 2003 || Haleakala || AMOS ||  || align=right | 3.4 km || 
|-id=652 bgcolor=#d6d6d6
| 578652 ||  || — || June 3, 2009 || Mount Lemmon || Mount Lemmon Survey ||  || align=right | 3.4 km || 
|-id=653 bgcolor=#E9E9E9
| 578653 ||  || — || March 7, 2014 || Mount Lemmon || Mount Lemmon Survey ||  || align=right | 2.0 km || 
|-id=654 bgcolor=#C2FFFF
| 578654 ||  || — || February 23, 2015 || Haleakala || Pan-STARRS || L4 || align=right | 6.8 km || 
|-id=655 bgcolor=#d6d6d6
| 578655 ||  || — || August 29, 2016 || Mount Lemmon || Mount Lemmon Survey ||  || align=right | 2.0 km || 
|-id=656 bgcolor=#d6d6d6
| 578656 ||  || — || February 28, 2014 || Haleakala || Pan-STARRS ||  || align=right | 2.6 km || 
|-id=657 bgcolor=#d6d6d6
| 578657 ||  || — || December 20, 2007 || Mount Lemmon || Mount Lemmon Survey ||  || align=right | 2.4 km || 
|-id=658 bgcolor=#d6d6d6
| 578658 ||  || — || October 19, 2011 || Mount Lemmon || Mount Lemmon Survey ||  || align=right | 2.3 km || 
|-id=659 bgcolor=#d6d6d6
| 578659 ||  || — || September 14, 2007 || Mount Lemmon || Mount Lemmon Survey ||  || align=right | 1.8 km || 
|-id=660 bgcolor=#d6d6d6
| 578660 ||  || — || September 30, 2006 || Kitt Peak || Spacewatch ||  || align=right | 2.0 km || 
|-id=661 bgcolor=#d6d6d6
| 578661 ||  || — || February 28, 2014 || Haleakala || Pan-STARRS ||  || align=right | 2.6 km || 
|-id=662 bgcolor=#fefefe
| 578662 ||  || — || October 3, 1999 || Kitt Peak || Spacewatch ||  || align=right data-sort-value="0.48" | 480 m || 
|-id=663 bgcolor=#d6d6d6
| 578663 ||  || — || September 4, 2011 || Haleakala || Pan-STARRS ||  || align=right | 2.8 km || 
|-id=664 bgcolor=#d6d6d6
| 578664 ||  || — || December 8, 2017 || Haleakala || Pan-STARRS ||  || align=right | 1.9 km || 
|-id=665 bgcolor=#d6d6d6
| 578665 ||  || — || October 4, 2006 || Mount Lemmon || Mount Lemmon Survey ||  || align=right | 2.2 km || 
|-id=666 bgcolor=#d6d6d6
| 578666 ||  || — || May 21, 2015 || Haleakala || Pan-STARRS ||  || align=right | 2.1 km || 
|-id=667 bgcolor=#d6d6d6
| 578667 ||  || — || August 14, 2016 || Haleakala || Pan-STARRS ||  || align=right | 1.8 km || 
|-id=668 bgcolor=#E9E9E9
| 578668 ||  || — || October 12, 2016 || Haleakala || Pan-STARRS ||  || align=right data-sort-value="0.98" | 980 m || 
|-id=669 bgcolor=#d6d6d6
| 578669 ||  || — || September 19, 2006 || Kitt Peak || Spacewatch ||  || align=right | 2.3 km || 
|-id=670 bgcolor=#d6d6d6
| 578670 ||  || — || July 7, 2016 || Haleakala || Pan-STARRS ||  || align=right | 2.1 km || 
|-id=671 bgcolor=#E9E9E9
| 578671 ||  || — || July 1, 2011 || Kitt Peak || Spacewatch ||  || align=right | 1.6 km || 
|-id=672 bgcolor=#d6d6d6
| 578672 ||  || — || November 19, 2007 || Kitt Peak || Spacewatch ||  || align=right | 2.3 km || 
|-id=673 bgcolor=#d6d6d6
| 578673 ||  || — || November 7, 2012 || Mount Lemmon || Mount Lemmon Survey ||  || align=right | 2.1 km || 
|-id=674 bgcolor=#d6d6d6
| 578674 ||  || — || September 25, 2006 || Kitt Peak || Spacewatch ||  || align=right | 2.2 km || 
|-id=675 bgcolor=#d6d6d6
| 578675 ||  || — || April 20, 2009 || Mount Lemmon || Mount Lemmon Survey ||  || align=right | 2.1 km || 
|-id=676 bgcolor=#d6d6d6
| 578676 ||  || — || October 2, 2011 || Piszkesteto || K. Sárneczky ||  || align=right | 3.4 km || 
|-id=677 bgcolor=#d6d6d6
| 578677 ||  || — || November 2, 2011 || Mount Lemmon || Mount Lemmon Survey ||  || align=right | 2.8 km || 
|-id=678 bgcolor=#d6d6d6
| 578678 ||  || — || October 6, 2016 || Haleakala || Pan-STARRS ||  || align=right | 2.1 km || 
|-id=679 bgcolor=#E9E9E9
| 578679 ||  || — || May 4, 2010 || Kitt Peak || Spacewatch ||  || align=right | 1.7 km || 
|-id=680 bgcolor=#d6d6d6
| 578680 ||  || — || October 22, 2012 || Haleakala || Pan-STARRS ||  || align=right | 2.0 km || 
|-id=681 bgcolor=#d6d6d6
| 578681 ||  || — || October 22, 2012 || Haleakala || Pan-STARRS ||  || align=right | 2.7 km || 
|-id=682 bgcolor=#E9E9E9
| 578682 ||  || — || October 28, 2016 || Haleakala || Pan-STARRS ||  || align=right data-sort-value="0.92" | 920 m || 
|-id=683 bgcolor=#d6d6d6
| 578683 ||  || — || September 26, 2011 || Mount Lemmon || Mount Lemmon Survey ||  || align=right | 2.2 km || 
|-id=684 bgcolor=#d6d6d6
| 578684 ||  || — || April 18, 2009 || Mount Lemmon || Mount Lemmon Survey ||  || align=right | 2.2 km || 
|-id=685 bgcolor=#d6d6d6
| 578685 ||  || — || August 30, 2016 || Mount Lemmon || Mount Lemmon Survey ||  || align=right | 2.2 km || 
|-id=686 bgcolor=#d6d6d6
| 578686 ||  || — || May 14, 2015 || Haleakala || Pan-STARRS ||  || align=right | 2.0 km || 
|-id=687 bgcolor=#d6d6d6
| 578687 ||  || — || March 19, 2009 || Calar Alto || F. Hormuth ||  || align=right | 2.5 km || 
|-id=688 bgcolor=#d6d6d6
| 578688 ||  || — || March 18, 2009 || Kitt Peak || Spacewatch ||  || align=right | 2.7 km || 
|-id=689 bgcolor=#C2FFFF
| 578689 ||  || — || May 27, 2017 || Haleakala || Pan-STARRS || L4 || align=right | 9.0 km || 
|-id=690 bgcolor=#d6d6d6
| 578690 ||  || — || December 18, 2007 || Mount Lemmon || Mount Lemmon Survey ||  || align=right | 2.3 km || 
|-id=691 bgcolor=#d6d6d6
| 578691 ||  || — || August 28, 2016 || Mount Lemmon || Mount Lemmon Survey ||  || align=right | 1.9 km || 
|-id=692 bgcolor=#d6d6d6
| 578692 ||  || — || August 31, 2005 || Kitt Peak || Spacewatch ||  || align=right | 3.2 km || 
|-id=693 bgcolor=#d6d6d6
| 578693 ||  || — || August 12, 2016 || Haleakala || Pan-STARRS ||  || align=right | 2.4 km || 
|-id=694 bgcolor=#C2FFFF
| 578694 ||  || — || September 17, 2009 || Kitt Peak || Spacewatch || L4 || align=right | 8.0 km || 
|-id=695 bgcolor=#d6d6d6
| 578695 ||  || — || August 28, 2016 || Mount Lemmon || Mount Lemmon Survey ||  || align=right | 2.4 km || 
|-id=696 bgcolor=#d6d6d6
| 578696 ||  || — || January 18, 2008 || Mount Lemmon || Mount Lemmon Survey ||  || align=right | 3.3 km || 
|-id=697 bgcolor=#d6d6d6
| 578697 ||  || — || October 2, 2006 || Mount Lemmon || Mount Lemmon Survey ||  || align=right | 2.5 km || 
|-id=698 bgcolor=#d6d6d6
| 578698 ||  || — || September 4, 2011 || Haleakala || Pan-STARRS ||  || align=right | 2.3 km || 
|-id=699 bgcolor=#d6d6d6
| 578699 ||  || — || July 12, 2016 || Mount Lemmon || Mount Lemmon Survey ||  || align=right | 3.2 km || 
|-id=700 bgcolor=#d6d6d6
| 578700 ||  || — || August 22, 2006 || Palomar || NEAT ||  || align=right | 2.4 km || 
|}

578701–578800 

|-bgcolor=#d6d6d6
| 578701 ||  || — || November 5, 2007 || Mount Lemmon || Mount Lemmon Survey ||  || align=right | 2.9 km || 
|-id=702 bgcolor=#E9E9E9
| 578702 ||  || — || March 2, 2014 || Cerro Tololo-DECam || CTIO-DECam ||  || align=right | 1.4 km || 
|-id=703 bgcolor=#d6d6d6
| 578703 ||  || — || September 4, 2011 || Haleakala || Pan-STARRS ||  || align=right | 2.4 km || 
|-id=704 bgcolor=#d6d6d6
| 578704 ||  || — || December 31, 2007 || Mount Lemmon || Mount Lemmon Survey ||  || align=right | 2.2 km || 
|-id=705 bgcolor=#d6d6d6
| 578705 ||  || — || March 23, 2009 || Calar Alto || F. Hormuth ||  || align=right | 2.5 km || 
|-id=706 bgcolor=#d6d6d6
| 578706 ||  || — || December 31, 2007 || Mount Lemmon || Mount Lemmon Survey ||  || align=right | 2.5 km || 
|-id=707 bgcolor=#E9E9E9
| 578707 ||  || — || February 28, 2014 || Haleakala || Pan-STARRS ||  || align=right data-sort-value="0.82" | 820 m || 
|-id=708 bgcolor=#d6d6d6
| 578708 ||  || — || September 19, 2006 || Kitt Peak || Spacewatch ||  || align=right | 2.4 km || 
|-id=709 bgcolor=#E9E9E9
| 578709 ||  || — || June 17, 2015 || Haleakala || Pan-STARRS ||  || align=right | 1.2 km || 
|-id=710 bgcolor=#d6d6d6
| 578710 ||  || — || October 29, 2017 || Haleakala || Pan-STARRS ||  || align=right | 2.3 km || 
|-id=711 bgcolor=#d6d6d6
| 578711 ||  || — || April 27, 2009 || Kitt Peak || Spacewatch ||  || align=right | 2.1 km || 
|-id=712 bgcolor=#fefefe
| 578712 ||  || — || October 3, 2015 || Mount Lemmon || Mount Lemmon Survey ||  || align=right data-sort-value="0.58" | 580 m || 
|-id=713 bgcolor=#d6d6d6
| 578713 ||  || — || June 5, 2003 || Kitt Peak || Spacewatch ||  || align=right | 4.1 km || 
|-id=714 bgcolor=#d6d6d6
| 578714 ||  || — || November 12, 2007 || Mount Lemmon || Mount Lemmon Survey ||  || align=right | 2.3 km || 
|-id=715 bgcolor=#E9E9E9
| 578715 ||  || — || March 12, 2014 || Mount Lemmon || Mount Lemmon Survey ||  || align=right | 2.0 km || 
|-id=716 bgcolor=#d6d6d6
| 578716 ||  || — || October 28, 2017 || Mount Lemmon || Mount Lemmon Survey ||  || align=right | 2.4 km || 
|-id=717 bgcolor=#d6d6d6
| 578717 ||  || — || March 10, 2014 || Mount Lemmon || Mount Lemmon Survey ||  || align=right | 2.5 km || 
|-id=718 bgcolor=#d6d6d6
| 578718 ||  || — || June 22, 2015 || Haleakala || Pan-STARRS 2 ||  || align=right | 2.2 km || 
|-id=719 bgcolor=#d6d6d6
| 578719 ||  || — || March 7, 2014 || Kitt Peak || Spacewatch ||  || align=right | 2.4 km || 
|-id=720 bgcolor=#E9E9E9
| 578720 ||  || — || March 5, 2014 || Kitt Peak || Spacewatch ||  || align=right | 1.5 km || 
|-id=721 bgcolor=#d6d6d6
| 578721 ||  || — || March 7, 2014 || Mount Lemmon || Mount Lemmon Survey ||  || align=right | 2.6 km || 
|-id=722 bgcolor=#d6d6d6
| 578722 ||  || — || March 5, 2014 || Kitt Peak || Spacewatch ||  || align=right | 2.2 km || 
|-id=723 bgcolor=#d6d6d6
| 578723 ||  || — || March 12, 2014 || Mount Lemmon || Mount Lemmon Survey ||  || align=right | 2.6 km || 
|-id=724 bgcolor=#d6d6d6
| 578724 ||  || — || March 11, 2014 || Kitt Peak || Spacewatch ||  || align=right | 2.1 km || 
|-id=725 bgcolor=#d6d6d6
| 578725 ||  || — || March 5, 2014 || Haleakala || Pan-STARRS ||  || align=right | 2.3 km || 
|-id=726 bgcolor=#d6d6d6
| 578726 ||  || — || March 10, 2014 || Mount Lemmon || Mount Lemmon Survey ||  || align=right | 2.0 km || 
|-id=727 bgcolor=#d6d6d6
| 578727 ||  || — || March 11, 2014 || Mount Lemmon || Mount Lemmon Survey ||  || align=right | 2.2 km || 
|-id=728 bgcolor=#d6d6d6
| 578728 ||  || — || March 10, 2014 || Mount Lemmon || Mount Lemmon Survey ||  || align=right | 2.7 km || 
|-id=729 bgcolor=#fefefe
| 578729 ||  || — || December 6, 2010 || Kitt Peak || Spacewatch || H || align=right data-sort-value="0.77" | 770 m || 
|-id=730 bgcolor=#d6d6d6
| 578730 ||  || — || September 24, 2011 || Haleakala || Pan-STARRS ||  || align=right | 2.2 km || 
|-id=731 bgcolor=#d6d6d6
| 578731 ||  || — || January 14, 2008 || Kitt Peak || Spacewatch ||  || align=right | 2.6 km || 
|-id=732 bgcolor=#d6d6d6
| 578732 ||  || — || January 11, 2008 || Kitt Peak || Spacewatch ||  || align=right | 2.3 km || 
|-id=733 bgcolor=#d6d6d6
| 578733 ||  || — || March 12, 2014 || Mount Lemmon || Mount Lemmon Survey ||  || align=right | 2.2 km || 
|-id=734 bgcolor=#d6d6d6
| 578734 ||  || — || August 30, 2011 || Haleakala || Pan-STARRS ||  || align=right | 2.6 km || 
|-id=735 bgcolor=#d6d6d6
| 578735 ||  || — || March 12, 2014 || Mount Lemmon || Mount Lemmon Survey ||  || align=right | 2.1 km || 
|-id=736 bgcolor=#d6d6d6
| 578736 ||  || — || March 12, 2014 || Mount Lemmon || Mount Lemmon Survey ||  || align=right | 2.3 km || 
|-id=737 bgcolor=#d6d6d6
| 578737 ||  || — || November 19, 2012 || Kitt Peak || Spacewatch ||  || align=right | 2.4 km || 
|-id=738 bgcolor=#d6d6d6
| 578738 ||  || — || September 24, 2011 || Haleakala || Pan-STARRS ||  || align=right | 3.0 km || 
|-id=739 bgcolor=#d6d6d6
| 578739 ||  || — || March 20, 2014 || Mount Lemmon || Mount Lemmon Survey ||  || align=right | 2.7 km || 
|-id=740 bgcolor=#d6d6d6
| 578740 ||  || — || October 14, 2001 || Apache Point || SDSS Collaboration ||  || align=right | 2.6 km || 
|-id=741 bgcolor=#d6d6d6
| 578741 ||  || — || September 15, 2006 || Kitt Peak || Spacewatch ||  || align=right | 3.1 km || 
|-id=742 bgcolor=#d6d6d6
| 578742 ||  || — || September 26, 2011 || Mount Lemmon || Mount Lemmon Survey ||  || align=right | 2.4 km || 
|-id=743 bgcolor=#d6d6d6
| 578743 ||  || — || March 6, 2014 || Kitt Peak || Spacewatch ||  || align=right | 2.5 km || 
|-id=744 bgcolor=#d6d6d6
| 578744 ||  || — || September 20, 2011 || Mount Lemmon || Mount Lemmon Survey ||  || align=right | 2.2 km || 
|-id=745 bgcolor=#d6d6d6
| 578745 ||  || — || December 23, 2012 || Haleakala || Pan-STARRS ||  || align=right | 2.5 km || 
|-id=746 bgcolor=#d6d6d6
| 578746 ||  || — || March 20, 2014 || Mount Lemmon || Mount Lemmon Survey ||  || align=right | 2.5 km || 
|-id=747 bgcolor=#d6d6d6
| 578747 ||  || — || March 20, 2014 || Mount Lemmon || Mount Lemmon Survey ||  || align=right | 2.7 km || 
|-id=748 bgcolor=#fefefe
| 578748 ||  || — || January 2, 2006 || Catalina || CSS || H || align=right data-sort-value="0.75" | 750 m || 
|-id=749 bgcolor=#d6d6d6
| 578749 ||  || — || February 28, 2014 || Haleakala || Pan-STARRS ||  || align=right | 2.2 km || 
|-id=750 bgcolor=#d6d6d6
| 578750 ||  || — || August 28, 2005 || Kitt Peak || Spacewatch ||  || align=right | 2.8 km || 
|-id=751 bgcolor=#E9E9E9
| 578751 ||  || — || March 23, 2014 || La Palma || La Palma Obs. ||  || align=right | 1.6 km || 
|-id=752 bgcolor=#E9E9E9
| 578752 ||  || — || December 13, 2013 || Mount Lemmon || Mount Lemmon Survey ||  || align=right | 1.2 km || 
|-id=753 bgcolor=#d6d6d6
| 578753 ||  || — || October 19, 2011 || Mount Lemmon || Mount Lemmon Survey ||  || align=right | 2.6 km || 
|-id=754 bgcolor=#d6d6d6
| 578754 ||  || — || December 4, 2012 || Mount Lemmon || Mount Lemmon Survey ||  || align=right | 1.9 km || 
|-id=755 bgcolor=#d6d6d6
| 578755 ||  || — || March 23, 2014 || Mount Lemmon || Mount Lemmon Survey ||  || align=right | 2.4 km || 
|-id=756 bgcolor=#d6d6d6
| 578756 ||  || — || October 2, 2006 || Mount Lemmon || Mount Lemmon Survey ||  || align=right | 3.4 km || 
|-id=757 bgcolor=#d6d6d6
| 578757 ||  || — || November 25, 2012 || Kitt Peak || Spacewatch ||  || align=right | 2.8 km || 
|-id=758 bgcolor=#d6d6d6
| 578758 ||  || — || July 11, 2005 || Kitt Peak || Spacewatch ||  || align=right | 3.0 km || 
|-id=759 bgcolor=#d6d6d6
| 578759 ||  || — || September 4, 2011 || Haleakala || Pan-STARRS ||  || align=right | 2.8 km || 
|-id=760 bgcolor=#d6d6d6
| 578760 ||  || — || March 23, 2014 || Mount Lemmon || Mount Lemmon Survey ||  || align=right | 2.3 km || 
|-id=761 bgcolor=#d6d6d6
| 578761 ||  || — || October 27, 2006 || Mount Lemmon || Mount Lemmon Survey ||  || align=right | 2.4 km || 
|-id=762 bgcolor=#d6d6d6
| 578762 ||  || — || December 5, 2007 || Mount Lemmon || Mount Lemmon Survey ||  || align=right | 1.9 km || 
|-id=763 bgcolor=#d6d6d6
| 578763 ||  || — || March 26, 2009 || Kitt Peak || Spacewatch ||  || align=right | 2.4 km || 
|-id=764 bgcolor=#d6d6d6
| 578764 ||  || — || September 21, 2011 || Kitt Peak || Spacewatch ||  || align=right | 2.7 km || 
|-id=765 bgcolor=#d6d6d6
| 578765 ||  || — || October 18, 2011 || Kitt Peak || Spacewatch ||  || align=right | 2.8 km || 
|-id=766 bgcolor=#d6d6d6
| 578766 ||  || — || October 15, 2001 || Palomar || NEAT ||  || align=right | 2.7 km || 
|-id=767 bgcolor=#d6d6d6
| 578767 ||  || — || September 20, 2011 || Haleakala || Pan-STARRS ||  || align=right | 3.4 km || 
|-id=768 bgcolor=#d6d6d6
| 578768 ||  || — || March 27, 2003 || Kitt Peak || Spacewatch ||  || align=right | 2.8 km || 
|-id=769 bgcolor=#fefefe
| 578769 ||  || — || January 25, 2006 || Nashville || R. Clingan ||  || align=right | 1.6 km || 
|-id=770 bgcolor=#d6d6d6
| 578770 ||  || — || January 8, 2013 || Oukaimeden || M. Ory ||  || align=right | 2.8 km || 
|-id=771 bgcolor=#d6d6d6
| 578771 ||  || — || September 4, 2011 || Haleakala || Pan-STARRS ||  || align=right | 2.9 km || 
|-id=772 bgcolor=#d6d6d6
| 578772 ||  || — || March 20, 2004 || Kitt Peak || Spacewatch ||  || align=right | 3.2 km || 
|-id=773 bgcolor=#d6d6d6
| 578773 ||  || — || March 11, 2014 || Mount Lemmon || Mount Lemmon Survey ||  || align=right | 2.4 km || 
|-id=774 bgcolor=#d6d6d6
| 578774 ||  || — || March 11, 2014 || Mount Lemmon || Mount Lemmon Survey ||  || align=right | 2.3 km || 
|-id=775 bgcolor=#d6d6d6
| 578775 ||  || — || March 11, 2014 || Mount Lemmon || Mount Lemmon Survey ||  || align=right | 2.8 km || 
|-id=776 bgcolor=#d6d6d6
| 578776 ||  || — || May 18, 2001 || Anderson Mesa || LONEOS || 7:4 || align=right | 4.3 km || 
|-id=777 bgcolor=#d6d6d6
| 578777 ||  || — || February 12, 2008 || Siding Spring || SSS ||  || align=right | 3.4 km || 
|-id=778 bgcolor=#d6d6d6
| 578778 ||  || — || April 25, 2015 || Haleakala || Pan-STARRS ||  || align=right | 2.2 km || 
|-id=779 bgcolor=#d6d6d6
| 578779 ||  || — || January 7, 2013 || Mount Lemmon || Mount Lemmon Survey ||  || align=right | 2.7 km || 
|-id=780 bgcolor=#d6d6d6
| 578780 ||  || — || March 31, 2014 || Mount Lemmon || Mount Lemmon Survey ||  || align=right | 2.3 km || 
|-id=781 bgcolor=#d6d6d6
| 578781 ||  || — || February 22, 2014 || Mount Lemmon || Mount Lemmon Survey ||  || align=right | 2.6 km || 
|-id=782 bgcolor=#fefefe
| 578782 ||  || — || January 17, 2007 || Kitt Peak || Spacewatch ||  || align=right data-sort-value="0.47" | 470 m || 
|-id=783 bgcolor=#d6d6d6
| 578783 ||  || — || February 18, 2008 || Catalina || CSS ||  || align=right | 3.4 km || 
|-id=784 bgcolor=#C2FFFF
| 578784 ||  || — || February 20, 2002 || Kitt Peak || Spacewatch || L4 || align=right | 12 km || 
|-id=785 bgcolor=#d6d6d6
| 578785 ||  || — || April 2, 2009 || Mount Lemmon || Mount Lemmon Survey ||  || align=right | 3.5 km || 
|-id=786 bgcolor=#d6d6d6
| 578786 ||  || — || February 3, 2008 || Catalina || CSS ||  || align=right | 3.3 km || 
|-id=787 bgcolor=#d6d6d6
| 578787 ||  || — || April 22, 2009 || Mount Lemmon || Mount Lemmon Survey ||  || align=right | 3.0 km || 
|-id=788 bgcolor=#d6d6d6
| 578788 ||  || — || March 31, 2014 || Mount Lemmon || Mount Lemmon Survey ||  || align=right | 2.5 km || 
|-id=789 bgcolor=#fefefe
| 578789 ||  || — || February 16, 2004 || Kitt Peak || Spacewatch ||  || align=right data-sort-value="0.66" | 660 m || 
|-id=790 bgcolor=#d6d6d6
| 578790 ||  || — || March 24, 2014 || Haleakala || Pan-STARRS ||  || align=right | 3.1 km || 
|-id=791 bgcolor=#d6d6d6
| 578791 ||  || — || October 24, 2011 || Kitt Peak || Spacewatch ||  || align=right | 2.7 km || 
|-id=792 bgcolor=#d6d6d6
| 578792 ||  || — || March 23, 2014 || Mount Lemmon || Mount Lemmon Survey ||  || align=right | 2.4 km || 
|-id=793 bgcolor=#d6d6d6
| 578793 ||  || — || September 8, 2016 || Haleakala || Pan-STARRS ||  || align=right | 2.2 km || 
|-id=794 bgcolor=#d6d6d6
| 578794 ||  || — || May 25, 2015 || Haleakala || Pan-STARRS ||  || align=right | 2.1 km || 
|-id=795 bgcolor=#d6d6d6
| 578795 ||  || — || September 26, 2017 || Haleakala || Pan-STARRS ||  || align=right | 2.7 km || 
|-id=796 bgcolor=#d6d6d6
| 578796 ||  || — || May 21, 2015 || Haleakala || Pan-STARRS ||  || align=right | 2.2 km || 
|-id=797 bgcolor=#d6d6d6
| 578797 ||  || — || March 24, 2014 || Haleakala || Pan-STARRS ||  || align=right | 2.0 km || 
|-id=798 bgcolor=#d6d6d6
| 578798 ||  || — || March 24, 2014 || Haleakala || Pan-STARRS ||  || align=right | 2.3 km || 
|-id=799 bgcolor=#d6d6d6
| 578799 ||  || — || March 25, 2014 || Mount Lemmon || Mount Lemmon Survey ||  || align=right | 2.5 km || 
|-id=800 bgcolor=#d6d6d6
| 578800 ||  || — || March 24, 2014 || Haleakala || Pan-STARRS ||  || align=right | 2.4 km || 
|}

578801–578900 

|-bgcolor=#d6d6d6
| 578801 ||  || — || March 24, 2014 || Haleakala || Pan-STARRS ||  || align=right | 2.6 km || 
|-id=802 bgcolor=#E9E9E9
| 578802 ||  || — || March 24, 2014 || Haleakala || Pan-STARRS ||  || align=right | 1.1 km || 
|-id=803 bgcolor=#d6d6d6
| 578803 ||  || — || January 18, 2009 || Kitt Peak || Spacewatch ||  || align=right | 2.6 km || 
|-id=804 bgcolor=#d6d6d6
| 578804 ||  || — || September 11, 2005 || Kitt Peak || Spacewatch ||  || align=right | 2.7 km || 
|-id=805 bgcolor=#d6d6d6
| 578805 ||  || — || March 26, 2003 || Kitt Peak || Spacewatch ||  || align=right | 2.6 km || 
|-id=806 bgcolor=#E9E9E9
| 578806 ||  || — || February 19, 2009 || Mount Lemmon || Mount Lemmon Survey ||  || align=right | 1.7 km || 
|-id=807 bgcolor=#d6d6d6
| 578807 ||  || — || February 28, 2008 || Mount Lemmon || Mount Lemmon Survey ||  || align=right | 2.8 km || 
|-id=808 bgcolor=#d6d6d6
| 578808 ||  || — || September 4, 2011 || Haleakala || Pan-STARRS ||  || align=right | 2.8 km || 
|-id=809 bgcolor=#d6d6d6
| 578809 ||  || — || September 8, 2011 || Kitt Peak || Spacewatch ||  || align=right | 2.4 km || 
|-id=810 bgcolor=#d6d6d6
| 578810 ||  || — || November 17, 2006 || Mount Lemmon || Mount Lemmon Survey ||  || align=right | 2.2 km || 
|-id=811 bgcolor=#d6d6d6
| 578811 ||  || — || February 22, 2014 || Kitt Peak || Spacewatch || Tj (2.99) || align=right | 2.8 km || 
|-id=812 bgcolor=#fefefe
| 578812 ||  || — || January 30, 2004 || Kitt Peak || Spacewatch ||  || align=right data-sort-value="0.50" | 500 m || 
|-id=813 bgcolor=#d6d6d6
| 578813 ||  || — || April 4, 2014 || Mount Lemmon || Mount Lemmon Survey ||  || align=right | 2.5 km || 
|-id=814 bgcolor=#d6d6d6
| 578814 ||  || — || March 7, 2008 || Mount Lemmon || Mount Lemmon Survey ||  || align=right | 2.6 km || 
|-id=815 bgcolor=#d6d6d6
| 578815 ||  || — || January 18, 2008 || Kitt Peak || Spacewatch ||  || align=right | 3.2 km || 
|-id=816 bgcolor=#d6d6d6
| 578816 ||  || — || November 3, 2011 || Mount Lemmon || Mount Lemmon Survey ||  || align=right | 3.0 km || 
|-id=817 bgcolor=#d6d6d6
| 578817 ||  || — || April 4, 2014 || Haleakala || Pan-STARRS ||  || align=right | 2.5 km || 
|-id=818 bgcolor=#fefefe
| 578818 ||  || — || April 11, 2004 || Palomar || NEAT ||  || align=right | 1.1 km || 
|-id=819 bgcolor=#d6d6d6
| 578819 ||  || — || February 26, 2014 || Mount Lemmon || Mount Lemmon Survey ||  || align=right | 2.1 km || 
|-id=820 bgcolor=#d6d6d6
| 578820 ||  || — || January 19, 2013 || Kitt Peak || Spacewatch ||  || align=right | 2.7 km || 
|-id=821 bgcolor=#d6d6d6
| 578821 ||  || — || January 10, 2013 || Haleakala || Pan-STARRS ||  || align=right | 2.9 km || 
|-id=822 bgcolor=#d6d6d6
| 578822 ||  || — || April 5, 2014 || Haleakala || Pan-STARRS ||  || align=right | 2.9 km || 
|-id=823 bgcolor=#d6d6d6
| 578823 ||  || — || December 22, 2012 || Charleston || R. Holmes ||  || align=right | 2.6 km || 
|-id=824 bgcolor=#E9E9E9
| 578824 ||  || — || February 24, 2014 || Haleakala || Pan-STARRS ||  || align=right | 1.4 km || 
|-id=825 bgcolor=#d6d6d6
| 578825 ||  || — || February 11, 2008 || Kitt Peak || Spacewatch ||  || align=right | 3.1 km || 
|-id=826 bgcolor=#d6d6d6
| 578826 ||  || — || October 27, 2006 || Pises || J.-M. Lopez || EOS || align=right | 2.0 km || 
|-id=827 bgcolor=#E9E9E9
| 578827 ||  || — || April 9, 2014 || Mount Lemmon || Mount Lemmon Survey ||  || align=right | 1.6 km || 
|-id=828 bgcolor=#d6d6d6
| 578828 ||  || — || January 22, 2013 || Mount Lemmon || Mount Lemmon Survey ||  || align=right | 2.7 km || 
|-id=829 bgcolor=#fefefe
| 578829 ||  || — || April 12, 2014 || Elena Remote || A. Oreshko || H || align=right data-sort-value="0.57" | 570 m || 
|-id=830 bgcolor=#d6d6d6
| 578830 ||  || — || February 10, 2014 || Haleakala || Pan-STARRS ||  || align=right | 2.1 km || 
|-id=831 bgcolor=#d6d6d6
| 578831 ||  || — || April 1, 2014 || Catalina || CSS ||  || align=right | 3.3 km || 
|-id=832 bgcolor=#C7FF8F
| 578832 ||  || — || April 5, 2014 || Haleakala || Pan-STARRS || centaur || align=right | 72 km || 
|-id=833 bgcolor=#C2E0FF
| 578833 ||  || — || April 5, 2014 || Haleakala || Pan-STARRS || SDOcritical || align=right | 220 km || 
|-id=834 bgcolor=#C2E0FF
| 578834 ||  || — || May 8, 2013 || Cerro Tololo || S. S. Sheppard, C. Trujillo || plutino || align=right | 174 km || 
|-id=835 bgcolor=#C2E0FF
| 578835 ||  || — || April 27, 2012 || Haleakala || Pan-STARRS || SDO || align=right | 249 km || 
|-id=836 bgcolor=#d6d6d6
| 578836 ||  || — || April 3, 2014 || Haleakala || Pan-STARRS ||  || align=right | 1.8 km || 
|-id=837 bgcolor=#d6d6d6
| 578837 ||  || — || March 31, 2014 || Kitt Peak || Spacewatch ||  || align=right | 2.7 km || 
|-id=838 bgcolor=#d6d6d6
| 578838 ||  || — || March 10, 2008 || Mount Lemmon || Mount Lemmon Survey ||  || align=right | 2.8 km || 
|-id=839 bgcolor=#d6d6d6
| 578839 ||  || — || February 13, 2008 || Catalina || CSS ||  || align=right | 2.6 km || 
|-id=840 bgcolor=#d6d6d6
| 578840 ||  || — || October 9, 1999 || Kitt Peak || Spacewatch ||  || align=right | 2.6 km || 
|-id=841 bgcolor=#d6d6d6
| 578841 ||  || — || April 5, 2014 || Haleakala || Pan-STARRS ||  || align=right | 2.9 km || 
|-id=842 bgcolor=#d6d6d6
| 578842 ||  || — || February 2, 2013 || Mount Lemmon || Mount Lemmon Survey ||  || align=right | 2.7 km || 
|-id=843 bgcolor=#d6d6d6
| 578843 ||  || — || April 5, 2014 || Haleakala || Pan-STARRS ||  || align=right | 2.1 km || 
|-id=844 bgcolor=#d6d6d6
| 578844 ||  || — || January 10, 2013 || Haleakala || Pan-STARRS ||  || align=right | 2.1 km || 
|-id=845 bgcolor=#d6d6d6
| 578845 ||  || — || January 15, 2007 || Mauna Kea || Mauna Kea Obs. ||  || align=right | 2.3 km || 
|-id=846 bgcolor=#fefefe
| 578846 ||  || — || April 5, 2014 || Haleakala || Pan-STARRS ||  || align=right data-sort-value="0.52" | 520 m || 
|-id=847 bgcolor=#C2E0FF
| 578847 ||  || — || April 8, 2014 || Haleakala || Pan-STARRS || other TNOcritical || align=right | 220 km || 
|-id=848 bgcolor=#d6d6d6
| 578848 ||  || — || April 5, 2014 || Haleakala || Pan-STARRS ||  || align=right | 2.7 km || 
|-id=849 bgcolor=#d6d6d6
| 578849 ||  || — || April 28, 2009 || Kitt Peak || Spacewatch ||  || align=right | 2.2 km || 
|-id=850 bgcolor=#d6d6d6
| 578850 ||  || — || April 5, 2014 || Haleakala || Pan-STARRS ||  || align=right | 2.3 km || 
|-id=851 bgcolor=#fefefe
| 578851 ||  || — || April 1, 2014 || Kitt Peak || Spacewatch ||  || align=right data-sort-value="0.49" | 490 m || 
|-id=852 bgcolor=#d6d6d6
| 578852 ||  || — || April 5, 2014 || Haleakala || Pan-STARRS ||  || align=right | 2.8 km || 
|-id=853 bgcolor=#d6d6d6
| 578853 ||  || — || April 5, 2014 || Haleakala || Pan-STARRS ||  || align=right | 2.2 km || 
|-id=854 bgcolor=#d6d6d6
| 578854 ||  || — || April 9, 2014 || Haleakala || Pan-STARRS ||  || align=right | 2.6 km || 
|-id=855 bgcolor=#d6d6d6
| 578855 ||  || — || April 1, 2014 || Mount Lemmon || Mount Lemmon Survey ||  || align=right | 2.2 km || 
|-id=856 bgcolor=#d6d6d6
| 578856 ||  || — || April 9, 2014 || Haleakala || Pan-STARRS ||  || align=right | 2.7 km || 
|-id=857 bgcolor=#d6d6d6
| 578857 ||  || — || April 5, 2014 || Haleakala || Pan-STARRS ||  || align=right | 2.4 km || 
|-id=858 bgcolor=#d6d6d6
| 578858 ||  || — || April 4, 2014 || Haleakala || Pan-STARRS ||  || align=right | 2.4 km || 
|-id=859 bgcolor=#d6d6d6
| 578859 ||  || — || April 9, 2014 || Mount Lemmon || Mount Lemmon Survey ||  || align=right | 2.6 km || 
|-id=860 bgcolor=#d6d6d6
| 578860 ||  || — || April 7, 2014 || Mount Lemmon || Mount Lemmon Survey ||  || align=right | 2.5 km || 
|-id=861 bgcolor=#d6d6d6
| 578861 ||  || — || April 7, 2014 || Mount Lemmon || Mount Lemmon Survey ||  || align=right | 2.5 km || 
|-id=862 bgcolor=#d6d6d6
| 578862 ||  || — || April 4, 2014 || Haleakala || Pan-STARRS ||  || align=right | 2.3 km || 
|-id=863 bgcolor=#d6d6d6
| 578863 ||  || — || April 5, 2014 || Haleakala || Pan-STARRS ||  || align=right | 2.7 km || 
|-id=864 bgcolor=#d6d6d6
| 578864 ||  || — || April 5, 2014 || Haleakala || Pan-STARRS ||  || align=right | 2.7 km || 
|-id=865 bgcolor=#d6d6d6
| 578865 ||  || — || April 9, 2014 || Haleakala || Pan-STARRS ||  || align=right | 2.5 km || 
|-id=866 bgcolor=#d6d6d6
| 578866 ||  || — || April 2, 2014 || Mount Lemmon || Mount Lemmon Survey ||  || align=right | 2.2 km || 
|-id=867 bgcolor=#d6d6d6
| 578867 ||  || — || April 5, 2014 || Haleakala || Pan-STARRS ||  || align=right | 2.2 km || 
|-id=868 bgcolor=#E9E9E9
| 578868 ||  || — || April 5, 2014 || Haleakala || Pan-STARRS ||  || align=right | 1.8 km || 
|-id=869 bgcolor=#d6d6d6
| 578869 ||  || — || April 5, 2014 || Haleakala || Pan-STARRS ||  || align=right | 2.6 km || 
|-id=870 bgcolor=#d6d6d6
| 578870 ||  || — || April 5, 2014 || Haleakala || Pan-STARRS ||  || align=right | 2.5 km || 
|-id=871 bgcolor=#fefefe
| 578871 ||  || — || April 5, 2014 || Haleakala || Pan-STARRS ||  || align=right data-sort-value="0.64" | 640 m || 
|-id=872 bgcolor=#d6d6d6
| 578872 ||  || — || March 23, 2014 || Kitt Peak || Spacewatch ||  || align=right | 2.6 km || 
|-id=873 bgcolor=#d6d6d6
| 578873 ||  || — || April 21, 2014 || Kitt Peak || Spacewatch ||  || align=right | 2.9 km || 
|-id=874 bgcolor=#fefefe
| 578874 ||  || — || October 22, 2012 || Haleakala || Pan-STARRS ||  || align=right data-sort-value="0.48" | 480 m || 
|-id=875 bgcolor=#d6d6d6
| 578875 ||  || — || April 1, 2014 || Kitt Peak || Spacewatch ||  || align=right | 2.5 km || 
|-id=876 bgcolor=#fefefe
| 578876 ||  || — || October 22, 2012 || Haleakala || Pan-STARRS ||  || align=right data-sort-value="0.65" | 650 m || 
|-id=877 bgcolor=#fefefe
| 578877 ||  || — || September 5, 2008 || Kitt Peak || Spacewatch ||  || align=right data-sort-value="0.55" | 550 m || 
|-id=878 bgcolor=#d6d6d6
| 578878 ||  || — || April 22, 2014 || Catalina || CSS ||  || align=right | 3.2 km || 
|-id=879 bgcolor=#d6d6d6
| 578879 ||  || — || October 24, 2011 || Mount Lemmon || Mount Lemmon Survey ||  || align=right | 2.3 km || 
|-id=880 bgcolor=#fefefe
| 578880 ||  || — || June 28, 2011 || Mount Lemmon || Mount Lemmon Survey ||  || align=right data-sort-value="0.64" | 640 m || 
|-id=881 bgcolor=#d6d6d6
| 578881 ||  || — || April 23, 2014 || Cerro Tololo-DECam || CTIO-DECam ||  || align=right | 2.6 km || 
|-id=882 bgcolor=#E9E9E9
| 578882 ||  || — || March 27, 2014 || Haleakala || Pan-STARRS ||  || align=right | 1.2 km || 
|-id=883 bgcolor=#fefefe
| 578883 ||  || — || March 25, 2014 || Kitt Peak || Spacewatch ||  || align=right data-sort-value="0.53" | 530 m || 
|-id=884 bgcolor=#d6d6d6
| 578884 ||  || — || September 22, 2000 || Kitt Peak || Spacewatch ||  || align=right | 3.3 km || 
|-id=885 bgcolor=#d6d6d6
| 578885 ||  || — || April 20, 2014 || Mount Lemmon || Mount Lemmon Survey ||  || align=right | 2.5 km || 
|-id=886 bgcolor=#d6d6d6
| 578886 ||  || — || April 24, 2014 || Mount Lemmon || Mount Lemmon Survey ||  || align=right | 2.7 km || 
|-id=887 bgcolor=#d6d6d6
| 578887 ||  || — || March 31, 2009 || Mount Lemmon || Mount Lemmon Survey ||  || align=right | 1.9 km || 
|-id=888 bgcolor=#d6d6d6
| 578888 ||  || — || October 26, 2011 || Haleakala || Pan-STARRS ||  || align=right | 3.0 km || 
|-id=889 bgcolor=#E9E9E9
| 578889 ||  || — || April 4, 2014 || Haleakala || Pan-STARRS ||  || align=right data-sort-value="0.75" | 750 m || 
|-id=890 bgcolor=#d6d6d6
| 578890 ||  || — || August 31, 2005 || Kitt Peak || Spacewatch ||  || align=right | 2.5 km || 
|-id=891 bgcolor=#fefefe
| 578891 ||  || — || February 8, 2007 || Mount Lemmon || Mount Lemmon Survey ||  || align=right data-sort-value="0.69" | 690 m || 
|-id=892 bgcolor=#d6d6d6
| 578892 ||  || — || October 26, 2011 || Haleakala || Pan-STARRS ||  || align=right | 3.6 km || 
|-id=893 bgcolor=#d6d6d6
| 578893 ||  || — || October 1, 2005 || Mount Lemmon || Mount Lemmon Survey ||  || align=right | 2.5 km || 
|-id=894 bgcolor=#d6d6d6
| 578894 ||  || — || November 18, 2011 || Mount Lemmon || Mount Lemmon Survey ||  || align=right | 2.4 km || 
|-id=895 bgcolor=#fefefe
| 578895 ||  || — || November 11, 1999 || Kitt Peak || M. W. Buie, S. D. Kern ||  || align=right data-sort-value="0.68" | 680 m || 
|-id=896 bgcolor=#d6d6d6
| 578896 ||  || — || April 23, 2014 || Cerro Tololo-DECam || CTIO-DECam ||  || align=right | 2.6 km || 
|-id=897 bgcolor=#d6d6d6
| 578897 ||  || — || October 16, 2006 || Mount Lemmon || Mount Lemmon Survey ||  || align=right | 2.3 km || 
|-id=898 bgcolor=#fefefe
| 578898 ||  || — || March 25, 2014 || Kitt Peak || Spacewatch ||  || align=right data-sort-value="0.57" | 570 m || 
|-id=899 bgcolor=#d6d6d6
| 578899 ||  || — || May 30, 2009 || Mount Lemmon || Mount Lemmon Survey ||  || align=right | 2.3 km || 
|-id=900 bgcolor=#E9E9E9
| 578900 ||  || — || January 17, 2013 || Haleakala || Pan-STARRS ||  || align=right | 1.7 km || 
|}

578901–579000 

|-bgcolor=#d6d6d6
| 578901 ||  || — || March 25, 2014 || Kitt Peak || Spacewatch ||  || align=right | 3.0 km || 
|-id=902 bgcolor=#d6d6d6
| 578902 ||  || — || October 19, 2011 || Mount Lemmon || Mount Lemmon Survey ||  || align=right | 1.9 km || 
|-id=903 bgcolor=#fefefe
| 578903 ||  || — || April 5, 2014 || Haleakala || Pan-STARRS ||  || align=right data-sort-value="0.62" | 620 m || 
|-id=904 bgcolor=#d6d6d6
| 578904 ||  || — || October 28, 2011 || Kitt Peak || Spacewatch ||  || align=right | 2.2 km || 
|-id=905 bgcolor=#fefefe
| 578905 ||  || — || January 24, 2007 || Mount Lemmon || Mount Lemmon Survey ||  || align=right data-sort-value="0.55" | 550 m || 
|-id=906 bgcolor=#d6d6d6
| 578906 ||  || — || September 14, 2005 || Kitt Peak || Spacewatch ||  || align=right | 2.5 km || 
|-id=907 bgcolor=#fefefe
| 578907 ||  || — || November 26, 2012 || Mount Lemmon || Mount Lemmon Survey ||  || align=right data-sort-value="0.60" | 600 m || 
|-id=908 bgcolor=#fefefe
| 578908 ||  || — || December 10, 2009 || Mount Lemmon || Mount Lemmon Survey ||  || align=right data-sort-value="0.59" | 590 m || 
|-id=909 bgcolor=#d6d6d6
| 578909 ||  || — || April 5, 2014 || Haleakala || Pan-STARRS ||  || align=right | 2.4 km || 
|-id=910 bgcolor=#d6d6d6
| 578910 ||  || — || October 25, 2011 || Haleakala || Pan-STARRS ||  || align=right | 2.6 km || 
|-id=911 bgcolor=#E9E9E9
| 578911 ||  || — || March 29, 2014 || Kitt Peak || Spacewatch ||  || align=right | 1.6 km || 
|-id=912 bgcolor=#d6d6d6
| 578912 ||  || — || November 6, 2010 || Mount Lemmon || Mount Lemmon Survey ||  || align=right | 2.3 km || 
|-id=913 bgcolor=#d6d6d6
| 578913 ||  || — || April 23, 2014 || Cerro Tololo-DECam || CTIO-DECam ||  || align=right | 2.1 km || 
|-id=914 bgcolor=#d6d6d6
| 578914 ||  || — || April 23, 2014 || Cerro Tololo-DECam || CTIO-DECam ||  || align=right | 2.2 km || 
|-id=915 bgcolor=#d6d6d6
| 578915 ||  || — || August 31, 2005 || Kitt Peak || Spacewatch || EOS || align=right | 1.3 km || 
|-id=916 bgcolor=#d6d6d6
| 578916 ||  || — || January 9, 2007 || Mount Lemmon || Mount Lemmon Survey ||  || align=right | 2.5 km || 
|-id=917 bgcolor=#fefefe
| 578917 ||  || — || August 31, 2005 || Kitt Peak || Spacewatch ||  || align=right data-sort-value="0.60" | 600 m || 
|-id=918 bgcolor=#d6d6d6
| 578918 ||  || — || October 26, 2011 || Haleakala || Pan-STARRS || 7:4 || align=right | 2.6 km || 
|-id=919 bgcolor=#d6d6d6
| 578919 ||  || — || March 25, 2003 || Kitt Peak || Spacewatch ||  || align=right | 3.0 km || 
|-id=920 bgcolor=#d6d6d6
| 578920 ||  || — || April 23, 2014 || Haleakala || Pan-STARRS ||  || align=right | 1.9 km || 
|-id=921 bgcolor=#d6d6d6
| 578921 ||  || — || November 12, 2005 || Kitt Peak || Spacewatch ||  || align=right | 2.1 km || 
|-id=922 bgcolor=#fefefe
| 578922 ||  || — || December 23, 2012 || Haleakala || Pan-STARRS ||  || align=right data-sort-value="0.54" | 540 m || 
|-id=923 bgcolor=#d6d6d6
| 578923 ||  || — || September 1, 2005 || Kitt Peak || Spacewatch ||  || align=right | 2.2 km || 
|-id=924 bgcolor=#d6d6d6
| 578924 ||  || — || November 10, 1999 || Kitt Peak || Spacewatch ||  || align=right | 3.2 km || 
|-id=925 bgcolor=#d6d6d6
| 578925 ||  || — || August 31, 2005 || Kitt Peak || Spacewatch ||  || align=right | 2.3 km || 
|-id=926 bgcolor=#d6d6d6
| 578926 ||  || — || December 24, 2012 || Mount Lemmon || Mount Lemmon Survey ||  || align=right | 2.9 km || 
|-id=927 bgcolor=#d6d6d6
| 578927 ||  || — || April 9, 2003 || Kitt Peak || Spacewatch ||  || align=right | 2.3 km || 
|-id=928 bgcolor=#d6d6d6
| 578928 ||  || — || April 8, 2014 || Kitt Peak || Spacewatch ||  || align=right | 2.7 km || 
|-id=929 bgcolor=#d6d6d6
| 578929 ||  || — || October 24, 2011 || Haleakala || Pan-STARRS ||  || align=right | 2.6 km || 
|-id=930 bgcolor=#d6d6d6
| 578930 ||  || — || March 18, 2009 || Kitt Peak || Spacewatch ||  || align=right | 1.9 km || 
|-id=931 bgcolor=#d6d6d6
| 578931 ||  || — || April 23, 2014 || Cerro Tololo-DECam || CTIO-DECam ||  || align=right | 1.8 km || 
|-id=932 bgcolor=#d6d6d6
| 578932 ||  || — || April 23, 2014 || Cerro Tololo-DECam || CTIO-DECam ||  || align=right | 3.1 km || 
|-id=933 bgcolor=#d6d6d6
| 578933 ||  || — || November 16, 2006 || Kitt Peak || Spacewatch ||  || align=right | 3.0 km || 
|-id=934 bgcolor=#d6d6d6
| 578934 ||  || — || April 14, 2008 || Mount Lemmon || Mount Lemmon Survey ||  || align=right | 2.3 km || 
|-id=935 bgcolor=#d6d6d6
| 578935 ||  || — || March 6, 2008 || Kitt Peak || Spacewatch ||  || align=right | 3.1 km || 
|-id=936 bgcolor=#d6d6d6
| 578936 ||  || — || December 23, 2012 || Haleakala || Pan-STARRS ||  || align=right | 2.2 km || 
|-id=937 bgcolor=#d6d6d6
| 578937 ||  || — || March 9, 2002 || Kitt Peak || Spacewatch || VER || align=right | 2.2 km || 
|-id=938 bgcolor=#d6d6d6
| 578938 ||  || — || December 8, 2012 || Kitt Peak || Spacewatch ||  || align=right | 2.8 km || 
|-id=939 bgcolor=#d6d6d6
| 578939 ||  || — || April 23, 2009 || Kitt Peak || Spacewatch ||  || align=right | 3.1 km || 
|-id=940 bgcolor=#d6d6d6
| 578940 ||  || — || September 24, 2011 || Haleakala || Pan-STARRS ||  || align=right | 2.3 km || 
|-id=941 bgcolor=#E9E9E9
| 578941 ||  || — || March 24, 2014 || Haleakala || Pan-STARRS ||  || align=right | 1.6 km || 
|-id=942 bgcolor=#d6d6d6
| 578942 ||  || — || May 2, 2003 || Kitt Peak || Spacewatch ||  || align=right | 3.1 km || 
|-id=943 bgcolor=#d6d6d6
| 578943 ||  || — || April 3, 2008 || Kitt Peak || Spacewatch || 7:4 || align=right | 2.8 km || 
|-id=944 bgcolor=#E9E9E9
| 578944 ||  || — || May 3, 2005 || Kitt Peak || Spacewatch ||  || align=right | 2.4 km || 
|-id=945 bgcolor=#d6d6d6
| 578945 ||  || — || August 31, 2005 || Kitt Peak || Spacewatch ||  || align=right | 2.9 km || 
|-id=946 bgcolor=#d6d6d6
| 578946 ||  || — || February 26, 2014 || Haleakala || Pan-STARRS ||  || align=right | 2.7 km || 
|-id=947 bgcolor=#d6d6d6
| 578947 ||  || — || October 26, 2005 || Kitt Peak || Spacewatch ||  || align=right | 3.1 km || 
|-id=948 bgcolor=#d6d6d6
| 578948 ||  || — || January 16, 2013 || Haleakala || Pan-STARRS ||  || align=right | 2.4 km || 
|-id=949 bgcolor=#d6d6d6
| 578949 ||  || — || October 26, 2011 || Haleakala || Pan-STARRS ||  || align=right | 2.6 km || 
|-id=950 bgcolor=#d6d6d6
| 578950 ||  || — || April 29, 2014 || Haleakala || Pan-STARRS ||  || align=right | 2.0 km || 
|-id=951 bgcolor=#d6d6d6
| 578951 ||  || — || April 29, 2014 || Haleakala || Pan-STARRS ||  || align=right | 2.2 km || 
|-id=952 bgcolor=#d6d6d6
| 578952 ||  || — || April 29, 2014 || Haleakala || Pan-STARRS ||  || align=right | 2.5 km || 
|-id=953 bgcolor=#d6d6d6
| 578953 ||  || — || February 18, 2008 || Mount Lemmon || Mount Lemmon Survey ||  || align=right | 2.6 km || 
|-id=954 bgcolor=#fefefe
| 578954 ||  || — || July 25, 2011 || Haleakala || Pan-STARRS ||  || align=right data-sort-value="0.54" | 540 m || 
|-id=955 bgcolor=#d6d6d6
| 578955 ||  || — || April 30, 2014 || Haleakala || Pan-STARRS ||  || align=right | 2.4 km || 
|-id=956 bgcolor=#d6d6d6
| 578956 ||  || — || April 29, 2014 || Haleakala || Pan-STARRS ||  || align=right | 2.8 km || 
|-id=957 bgcolor=#d6d6d6
| 578957 ||  || — || April 5, 2014 || Haleakala || Pan-STARRS ||  || align=right | 2.4 km || 
|-id=958 bgcolor=#d6d6d6
| 578958 ||  || — || April 30, 2014 || Haleakala || Pan-STARRS ||  || align=right | 2.5 km || 
|-id=959 bgcolor=#fefefe
| 578959 ||  || — || January 28, 2007 || Mount Lemmon || Mount Lemmon Survey ||  || align=right data-sort-value="0.52" | 520 m || 
|-id=960 bgcolor=#d6d6d6
| 578960 ||  || — || April 30, 2014 || Haleakala || Pan-STARRS ||  || align=right | 2.2 km || 
|-id=961 bgcolor=#d6d6d6
| 578961 ||  || — || April 29, 2014 || Haleakala || Pan-STARRS ||  || align=right | 2.3 km || 
|-id=962 bgcolor=#d6d6d6
| 578962 ||  || — || April 23, 2014 || Haleakala || Pan-STARRS ||  || align=right | 2.6 km || 
|-id=963 bgcolor=#d6d6d6
| 578963 ||  || — || April 30, 2014 || Haleakala || Pan-STARRS ||  || align=right | 2.1 km || 
|-id=964 bgcolor=#d6d6d6
| 578964 ||  || — || April 29, 2014 || Haleakala || Pan-STARRS ||  || align=right | 2.7 km || 
|-id=965 bgcolor=#d6d6d6
| 578965 ||  || — || April 29, 2014 || Haleakala || Pan-STARRS ||  || align=right | 2.7 km || 
|-id=966 bgcolor=#d6d6d6
| 578966 ||  || — || April 21, 2014 || Mount Lemmon || Mount Lemmon Survey ||  || align=right | 2.7 km || 
|-id=967 bgcolor=#d6d6d6
| 578967 ||  || — || April 29, 2014 || Haleakala || Pan-STARRS ||  || align=right | 2.4 km || 
|-id=968 bgcolor=#d6d6d6
| 578968 ||  || — || May 1, 2014 || ESA OGS || ESA OGS ||  || align=right | 3.0 km || 
|-id=969 bgcolor=#fefefe
| 578969 ||  || — || October 18, 2012 || Haleakala || Pan-STARRS ||  || align=right data-sort-value="0.69" | 690 m || 
|-id=970 bgcolor=#d6d6d6
| 578970 ||  || — || March 9, 2014 || Haleakala || Pan-STARRS ||  || align=right | 2.6 km || 
|-id=971 bgcolor=#fefefe
| 578971 ||  || — || September 23, 2008 || Mount Lemmon || Mount Lemmon Survey ||  || align=right data-sort-value="0.56" | 560 m || 
|-id=972 bgcolor=#E9E9E9
| 578972 ||  || — || April 4, 2014 || Haleakala || Pan-STARRS ||  || align=right | 2.1 km || 
|-id=973 bgcolor=#d6d6d6
| 578973 ||  || — || December 24, 2006 || Kitt Peak || Spacewatch ||  || align=right | 3.1 km || 
|-id=974 bgcolor=#d6d6d6
| 578974 ||  || — || October 28, 2006 || Mount Lemmon || Mount Lemmon Survey ||  || align=right | 2.2 km || 
|-id=975 bgcolor=#d6d6d6
| 578975 ||  || — || April 20, 2009 || Kitt Peak || Spacewatch ||  || align=right | 2.8 km || 
|-id=976 bgcolor=#d6d6d6
| 578976 ||  || — || May 4, 2014 || Haleakala || Pan-STARRS ||  || align=right | 1.9 km || 
|-id=977 bgcolor=#d6d6d6
| 578977 ||  || — || February 28, 2014 || Haleakala || Pan-STARRS ||  || align=right | 3.5 km || 
|-id=978 bgcolor=#fefefe
| 578978 ||  || — || May 5, 2014 || Mount Lemmon || Mount Lemmon Survey ||  || align=right data-sort-value="0.57" | 570 m || 
|-id=979 bgcolor=#d6d6d6
| 578979 ||  || — || March 5, 2013 || Haleakala || Pan-STARRS ||  || align=right | 2.8 km || 
|-id=980 bgcolor=#d6d6d6
| 578980 ||  || — || January 17, 2007 || Kitt Peak || Spacewatch ||  || align=right | 3.4 km || 
|-id=981 bgcolor=#d6d6d6
| 578981 ||  || — || May 4, 2014 || Haleakala || Pan-STARRS ||  || align=right | 2.2 km || 
|-id=982 bgcolor=#d6d6d6
| 578982 ||  || — || November 27, 2011 || Mount Lemmon || Mount Lemmon Survey ||  || align=right | 2.8 km || 
|-id=983 bgcolor=#d6d6d6
| 578983 ||  || — || April 30, 2014 || Haleakala || Pan-STARRS ||  || align=right | 2.7 km || 
|-id=984 bgcolor=#fefefe
| 578984 ||  || — || April 25, 2007 || Kitt Peak || Spacewatch ||  || align=right data-sort-value="0.71" | 710 m || 
|-id=985 bgcolor=#d6d6d6
| 578985 ||  || — || July 29, 2005 || Palomar || NEAT ||  || align=right | 3.1 km || 
|-id=986 bgcolor=#fefefe
| 578986 ||  || — || May 6, 2014 || Haleakala || Pan-STARRS ||  || align=right data-sort-value="0.49" | 490 m || 
|-id=987 bgcolor=#E9E9E9
| 578987 ||  || — || April 11, 2005 || Mount Lemmon || Mount Lemmon Survey ||  || align=right | 2.0 km || 
|-id=988 bgcolor=#fefefe
| 578988 ||  || — || April 30, 2014 || Haleakala || Pan-STARRS ||  || align=right data-sort-value="0.63" | 630 m || 
|-id=989 bgcolor=#FA8072
| 578989 ||  || — || April 29, 2014 || ESA OGS || ESA OGS || H || align=right data-sort-value="0.54" | 540 m || 
|-id=990 bgcolor=#d6d6d6
| 578990 ||  || — || April 8, 2014 || Mount Lemmon || Mount Lemmon Survey ||  || align=right | 3.0 km || 
|-id=991 bgcolor=#C7FF8F
| 578991 ||  || — || February 1, 2005 || Kitt Peak || Spacewatch || centaur || align=right | 27 km || 
|-id=992 bgcolor=#C2E0FF
| 578992 ||  || — || April 13, 2013 || Haleakala || Pan-STARRS || plutinocritical || align=right | 147 km || 
|-id=993 bgcolor=#C2E0FF
| 578993 ||  || — || April 21, 2013 || Haleakala || Pan-STARRS || plutinocritical || align=right | 419 km || 
|-id=994 bgcolor=#d6d6d6
| 578994 ||  || — || May 6, 2014 || Haleakala || Pan-STARRS ||  || align=right | 1.7 km || 
|-id=995 bgcolor=#d6d6d6
| 578995 ||  || — || November 18, 2007 || Kitt Peak || Spacewatch ||  || align=right | 3.5 km || 
|-id=996 bgcolor=#d6d6d6
| 578996 ||  || — || May 6, 2014 || Haleakala || Pan-STARRS ||  || align=right | 2.5 km || 
|-id=997 bgcolor=#C2E0FF
| 578997 ||  || — || February 28, 2010 || Haleakala || Pan-STARRS || centaur || align=right | 116 km || 
|-id=998 bgcolor=#d6d6d6
| 578998 ||  || — || September 6, 2016 || Haleakala || Pan-STARRS ||  || align=right | 2.7 km || 
|-id=999 bgcolor=#d6d6d6
| 578999 ||  || — || June 27, 2015 || Haleakala || Pan-STARRS ||  || align=right | 2.5 km || 
|-id=000 bgcolor=#fefefe
| 579000 ||  || — || May 8, 2014 || Haleakala || Pan-STARRS ||  || align=right data-sort-value="0.52" | 520 m || 
|}

References

External links 
 Discovery Circumstances: Numbered Minor Planets (575001)–(580000) (IAU Minor Planet Center)

0578